= List of Korean painters =

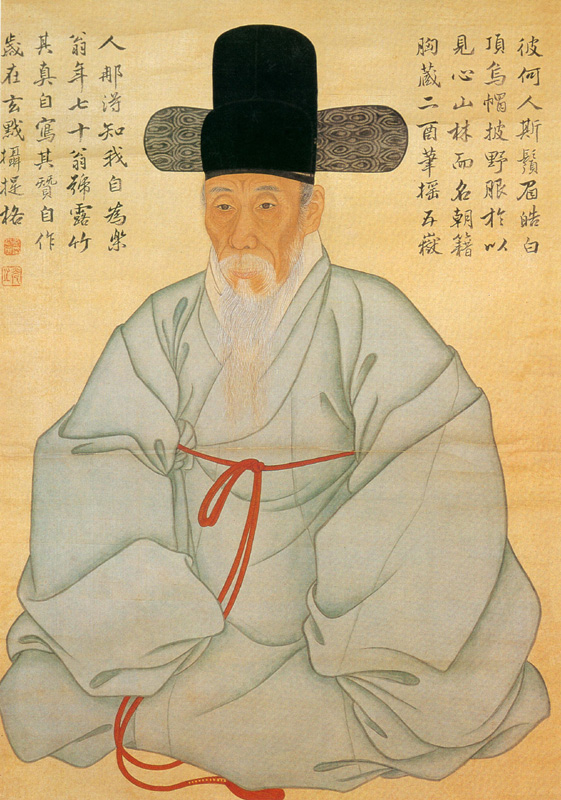
Self-portrait of Kang Sehwang

This page lists notable Korean painters beginning from the Joseon Dynasty, including any born in Korea or identifying themselves as Korean.

== Joseon period ==
Name	Korean name	Hanja	Date	Note
An Kyŏn	안견	安堅	c. 1400 – c. 1470	drew Mongyu dowondo (몽유도원도) for Grand Prince Anpyeong in 1447
An Chungsik	안중식	安中植	1861–1919	Spring Dawn at Mt. Baegak (백악춘효), 1915
Pyŏn Sangbyŏk	변상벽	卞相璧	fl. 1663 – fl. 1773	known for cat paintings
Ch'oe Puk	최북	崔北	1712–1760	
Ch'oe Susŏng	최수성	崔壽峸	1487–1521	
Kang Hŭian	강희안	姜希顔	1419–1464	
Kang Sehwang	강세황	姜世晃	1713–1791	
Hŏ Nansŏrhŏn	허난설헌	許蘭雪軒	1563–1589	
Hwang Kich'ŏn	황기천		1760–1821	
Chang Sŭngŏp	장승업, 오원	張承業 吾園	1843–1897	
Chŏng Sŏn	정선	鄭敾	1676–1759	
Chŏng Hongnae	정홍래; 鄭弘來	Nicknames 晩香 and 菊塢	1720–	known for portraying birds of prey
Kim Tŭksin	김득신	金得臣	1754–1822	
Kim Turyang	김두량	金斗樑	1696–1763	known for dog paintings
Kim Ŭnghwan	김응환	金應煥	1742–1789	
Kim Hongdo	김홍도, 단원	金弘道 檀園	1745 – c. 1806	
Kim Chŏnghŭi	김정희	金正喜	1786–1856	known for both characteristic calligraphy and paintings
Kim Myŏngguk	김명국	金明國	b. 1600 – fl. 1636	known for Dalmado
Kim Sik	김식	金埴	1579–1662	
Kim Such'ŏl	김수철	金秀哲		
Nam Kyeu	남계우	南啓宇	1811–1888	known for butterfly paintings
Shin Saimdang	신사임당	申師任堂	1504–1551	
Sin Yu	신유	申濡	1610–1665	
Sin Wi	신위	申緯	1769–1845	
Sin Yunbok, Hyewon	신윤복, 혜원	申潤福 蕙園	1758 – c. 1813	
Sim Sajŏng	심사정	沈師正	1707–1769	
Yi Am	이암	李嵒	1499–	
Yi Hanch'ŏl	이한철	李漢喆	1808–	
Yi Inmun	이인문	李寅文	1745–1821	
Yi Insang	이인상	李麟祥	1710–1760	
Yi Chaegwan	이재관	李在寬	1783–1837	
Yi Chŏng	이정	李霆	1541–1622	
Yi Chŏng	이정	李楨	1578–1607	
Yun Tusŏ	윤두서	尹斗緖	1668–1715	known for his self-portrait and horse paintings

== 20th century ==
Name	Korean name	Date	Note	References
Na Hye-sok	나혜석	1896–1948		
Yi Eungro	이응로	1904–1989		
Kim Hwan-gi	김환기	1913–1974		
Park Su-geun	박수근	1914–1965		
Lee Jung Seob	이중섭	1916–1956		
Chang Ucchin	장욱진	1918–1990		
Moon Shin	문신	1922–1995		,
Park Naehyeon	박내현	1920–1976		
Bae Dong-shin	배동신	1920–2008	pioneer of Korean watercolor	artist watercolor painter

== Contemporary painters ==
Name	Korean name	Born	Note	References
Rhee, Seund Ja	이성자	1918–2009	The Milky Way at Tourrettes, Var	
Kim Tschang Yeul	김창열	1929	Lives in Paris. Known for Water Drops (1978)	
Park Seo-Bo	박서보	1931		
Song Su-nam	송수남	1938 – 2013	Key figure in the Sumukhwa movement	
Kim Sang-Soon	김상순	1939		
O Yoon	오윤	1946–1986		
Lee Dong Youb	이동엽	1946		
Seok Cheoljoo	석철주	1950		
Park, Hang-Ryul	박항률	1950		
Suh Yongsun	서용선	1951	Korea's artist of the year 2009	
Ko Young-hoon	고영훈	1952	Surrealist painter	
Kim Byung-jong	김병종	1953	South Korean painter	
Kim, Tschoon Su	김춘수	1957	paintings in Blue	
Ran Hwang	황란	1960		
D Hwang	황일동	1969		
Oh, Junggeun	오정근	1970	lives in Berlin. Known for The Interspaces	
Moon, Jiha	문지하	1973		
Park, MeeNa	박미나	1973	South Korean painter	
Choe, David	데이비드 최	1976	Korean-American painter, muralist, graffiti artist and graphic novelist	
Hyon Gyon	박현경	1979		
Shin Se-won	신세원	1984		
Kim Tae-yeon	김태연	1986		
Shin KwangHo	신광호	?		
Sun Mu	선무	?	North Korean defector, known for his propaganda-style political paintings	

== See also ==
- Korean painting
- Korean art
