= Ch'oe Puk =

Korean painter (1712–1760)

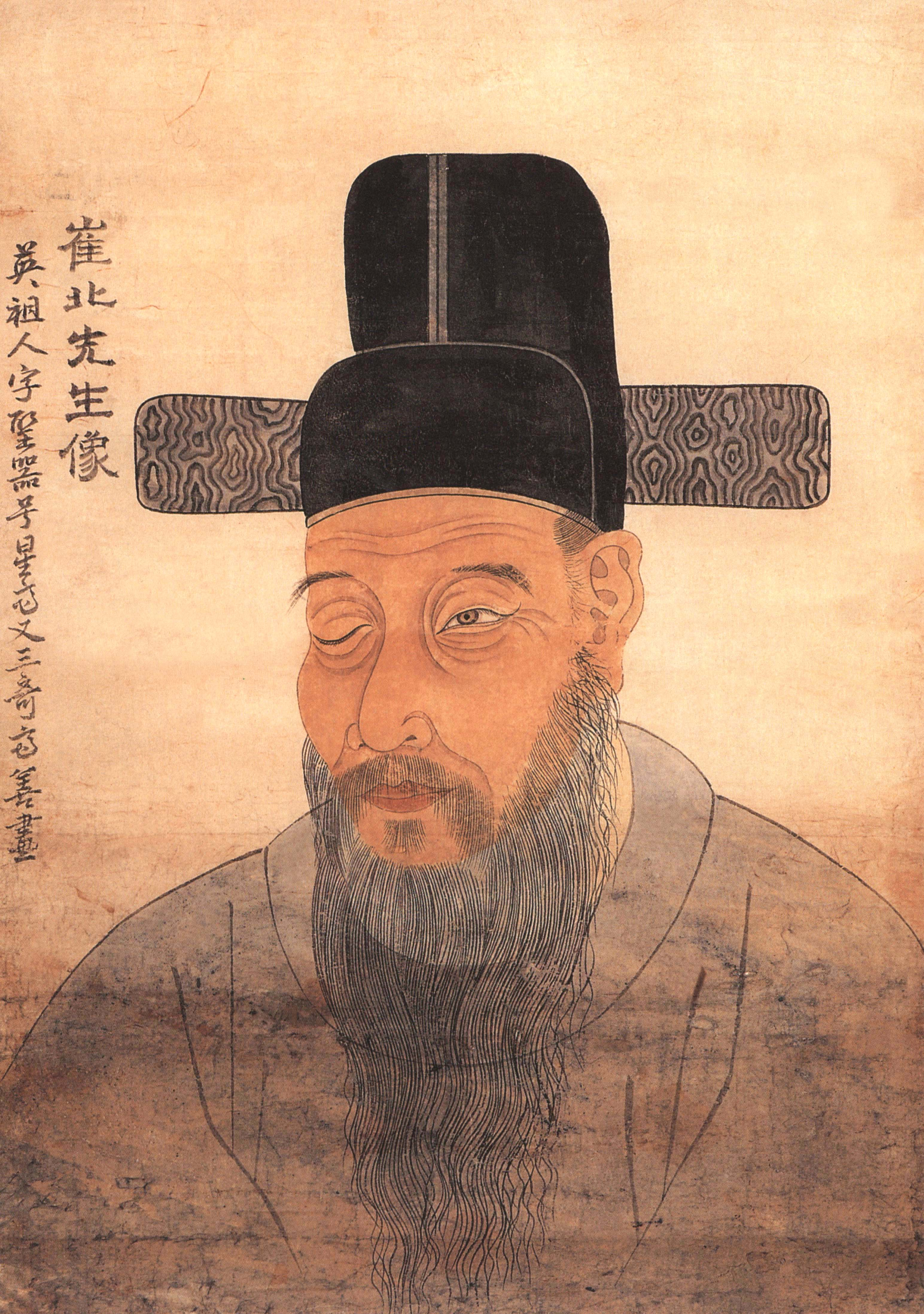

Korean name
- Hangul: 최북
- Hanja: 崔北
- RR: Choe Buk
- MR: Ch'oe Puk

Art name
- Hangul: 호생관, 삼기재, 거기재
- Hanja: 毫生館, 三奇齋, 居其齋
- RR: Hosaenggwan, Samgijae, Geogijae
- MR: Hosaenggwan, Samgijae, Kŏgijae

Courtesy name
- Hangul: 성기, 유용
- Hanja: 聖器, 有用
- RR: Seonggi, Yuyong
- MR: Sŏnggi, Yuyong

Ch'oe Puk (Korean: 최북; fl. 1712–1760), was a Korean painter of the late Joseon period. He used many art names including Samgijae, Hosaenggwan, Songjae, Kiam, and Kŏgijae.

== Biography ==
His childhood remains unknown, as well as the social status of his family. The Grove says 'floruit c. 1755–85'.

He was known as a skilled landscape painter, but also drew portraits, flowers and animals. Legend tells of a powerful aristocrat that forced him to draw, but Ch'oe refused to do so and as a result had one eye pierced, leading to the loss sight in that eye.

He was known to have traveled in Japan and was known to Zheng Zhilong's family; painting an image of Zheng's wife and their son Koxinga. The original returned to Korea with Ch'oe, but a copy was kept with the family and was later emulated by Pak Chega.

His living situation became increasingly difficult, so he made a living by wandering around town and selling paintings. On the spot, he drew pictures at the request of others and received money for them, but the price was not set. When a requester offered Ch'oe a small amount of money for one of his fine works, he would become so angry that he would scream and tear up the painting.

However, to those who were willing to pay a lot of money for his low-quality works, Ch'oe mocked them and ordered them to take them immediately, saying: “That fool doesn’t even know the value of paintings."

== Style and Galleries ==
Ch'oe Puk engraved his name and pen name in the center of the painting. He was acquainted with Kim Hong-do, Kim Tŭksin, Yi In-mun, but his works are dissimilar to theirs.

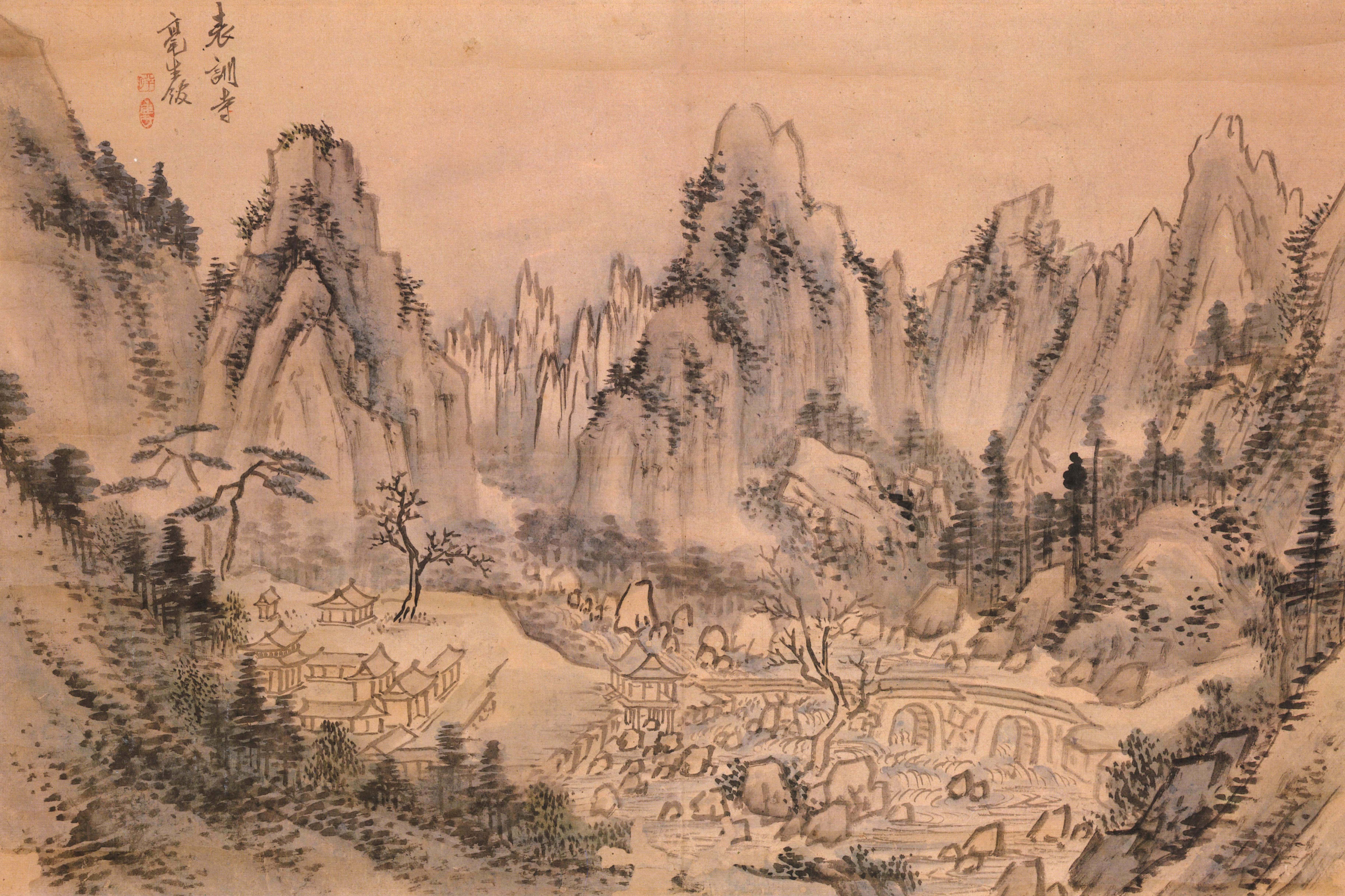
Pyohun Temple at Diamond Mountains

The Korean Copyright Commission lists 20 paintings for Ch'oe Puk, while Towooart gives a short notice.

Ch'oe Puk paintings

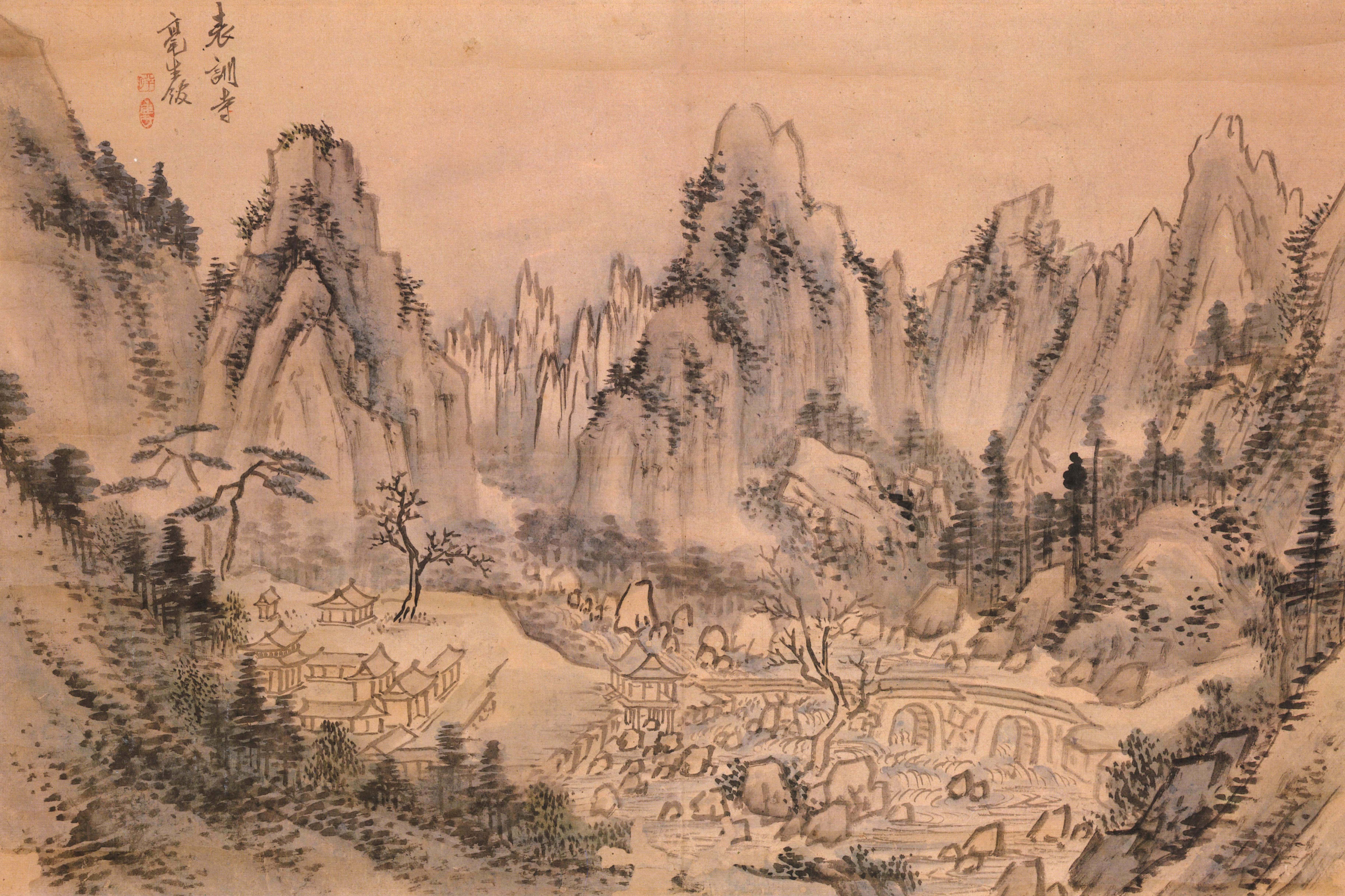
Pyohun Temple
금강산 표훈사도

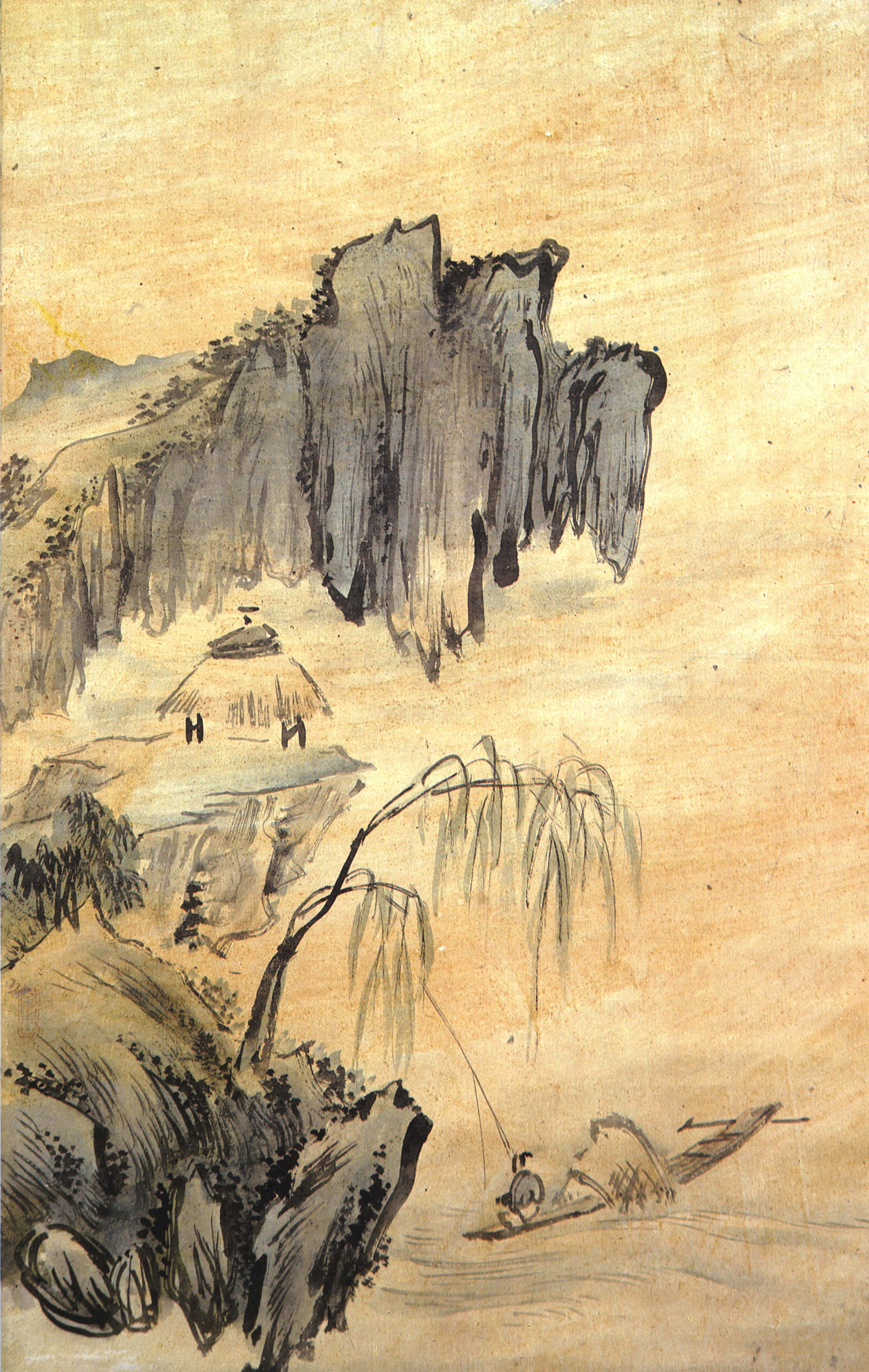
Jo-eo Landscape
조어산수

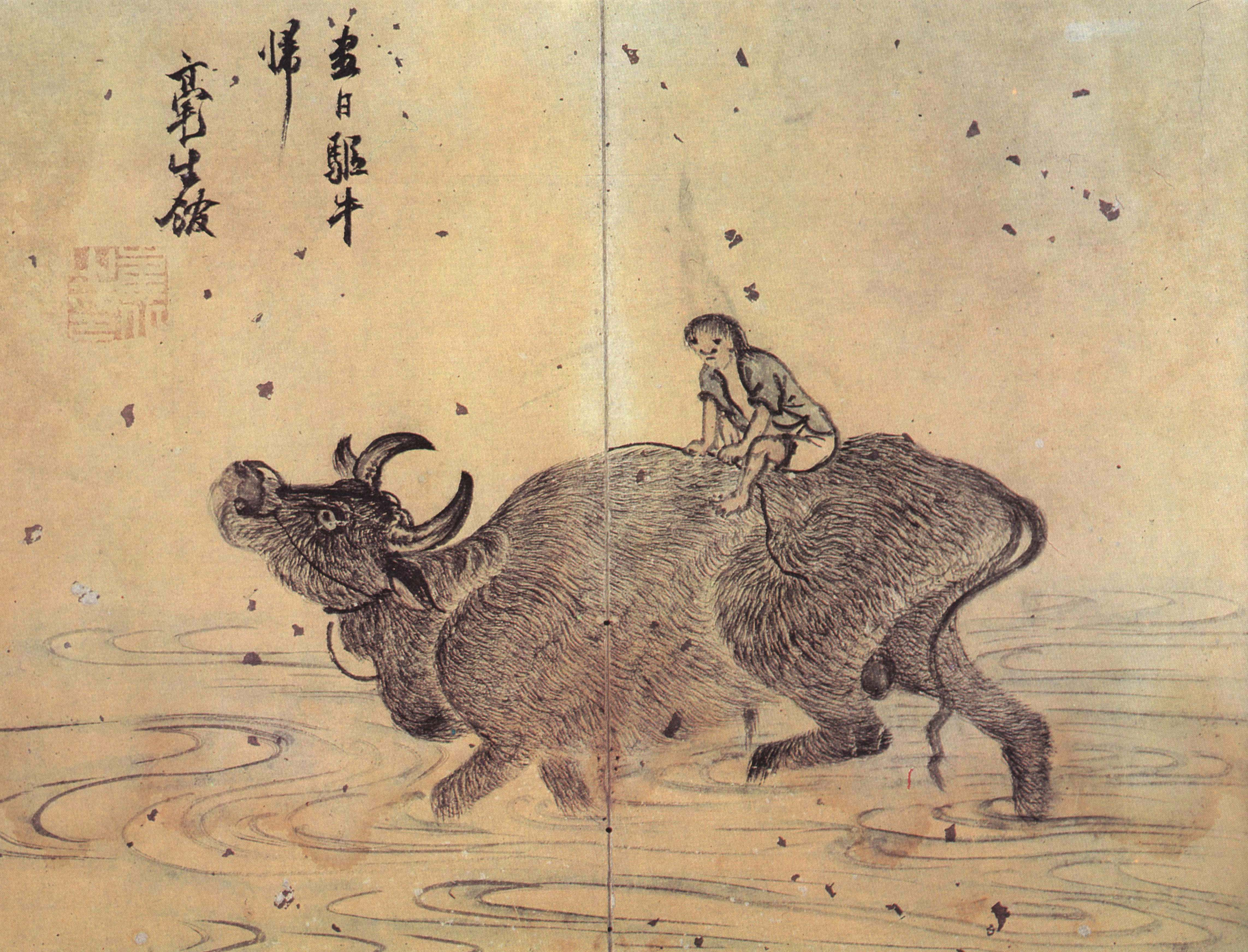
Bull riding
맹우도(려우귀가)

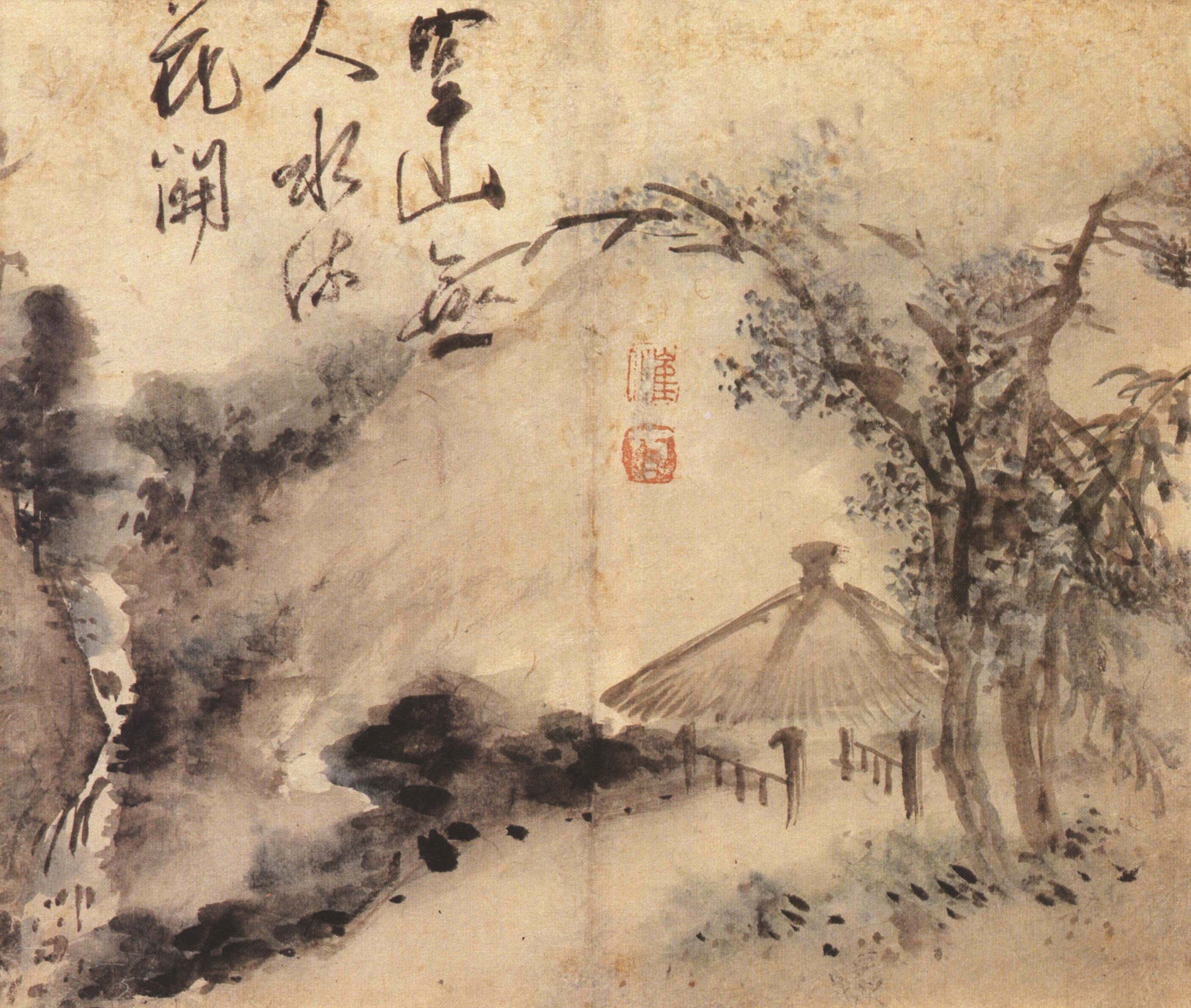
Cho-ok Landscape
초옥산수

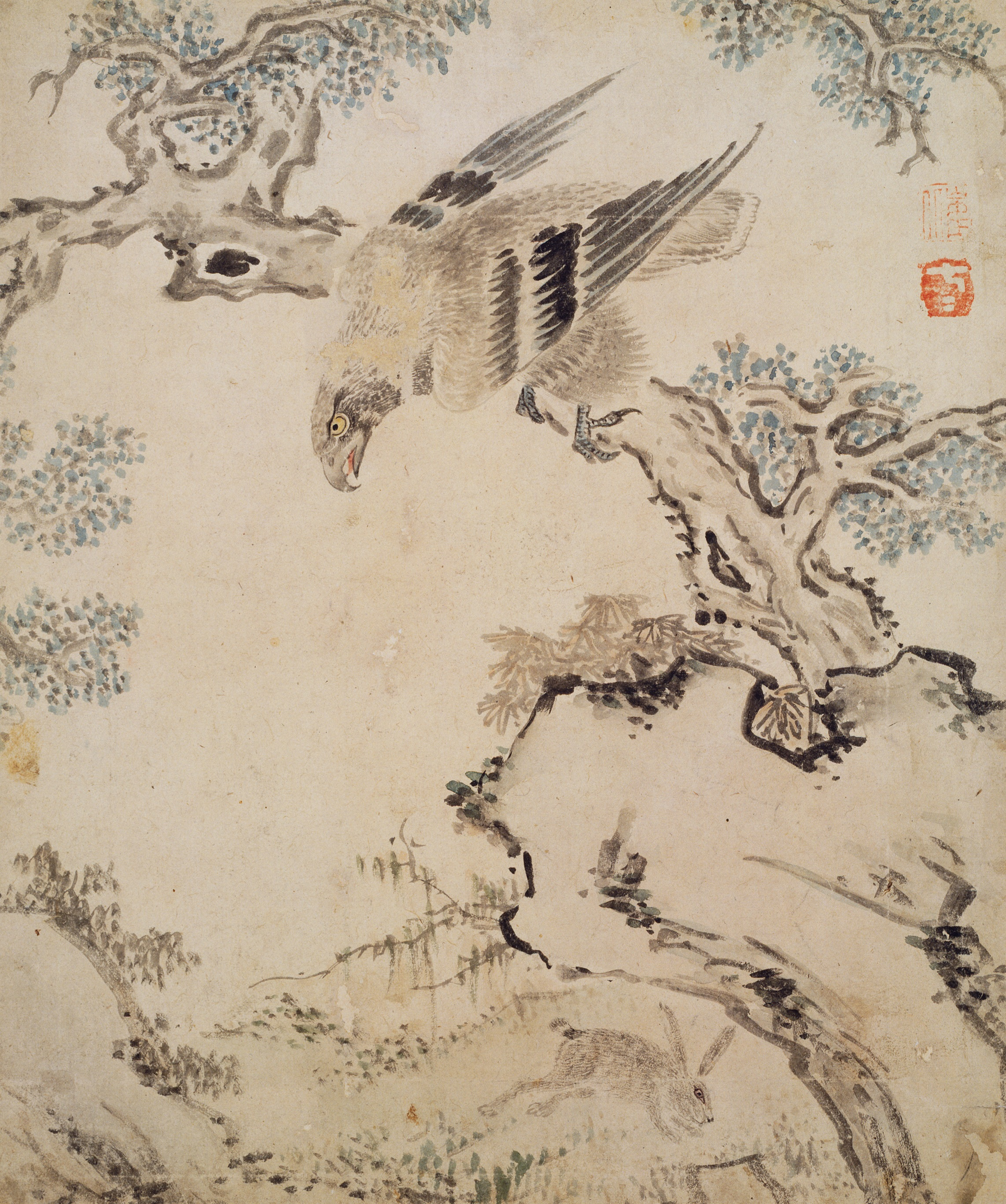
A hawk that catches a rabbit
토끼를 잡아챈 매 (豪鷹博兎圖)

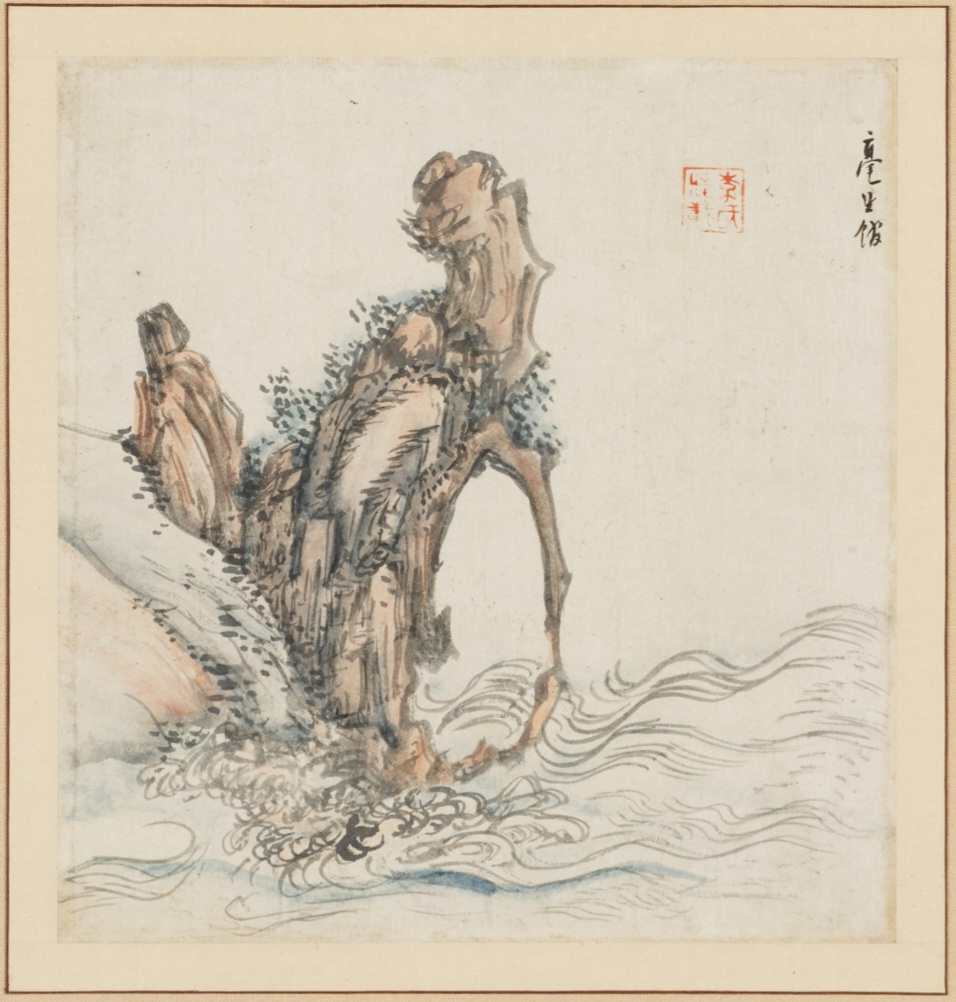
Haebyeon-giamdo
해변기암도

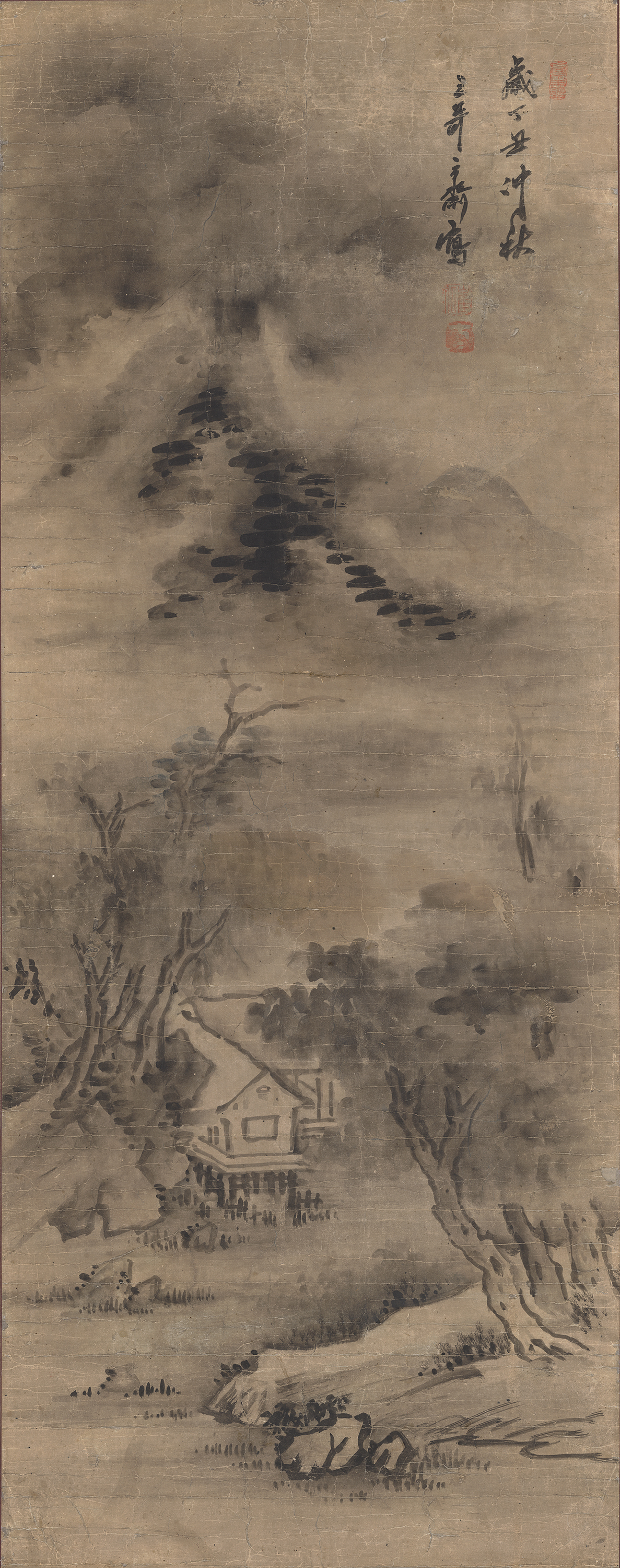
Sansuhwa
산수화

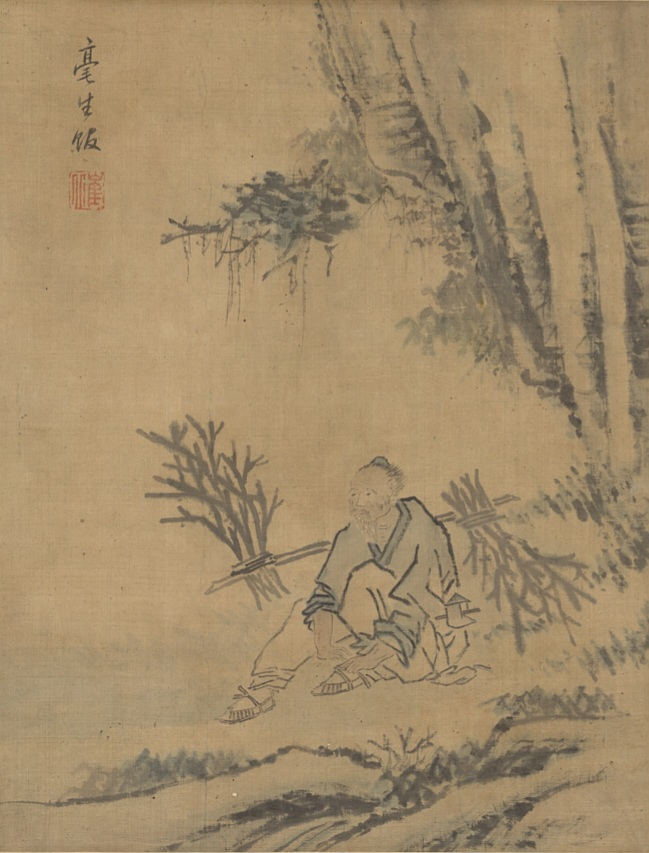
Genre painting
Sansudo (Korean: 산수도)

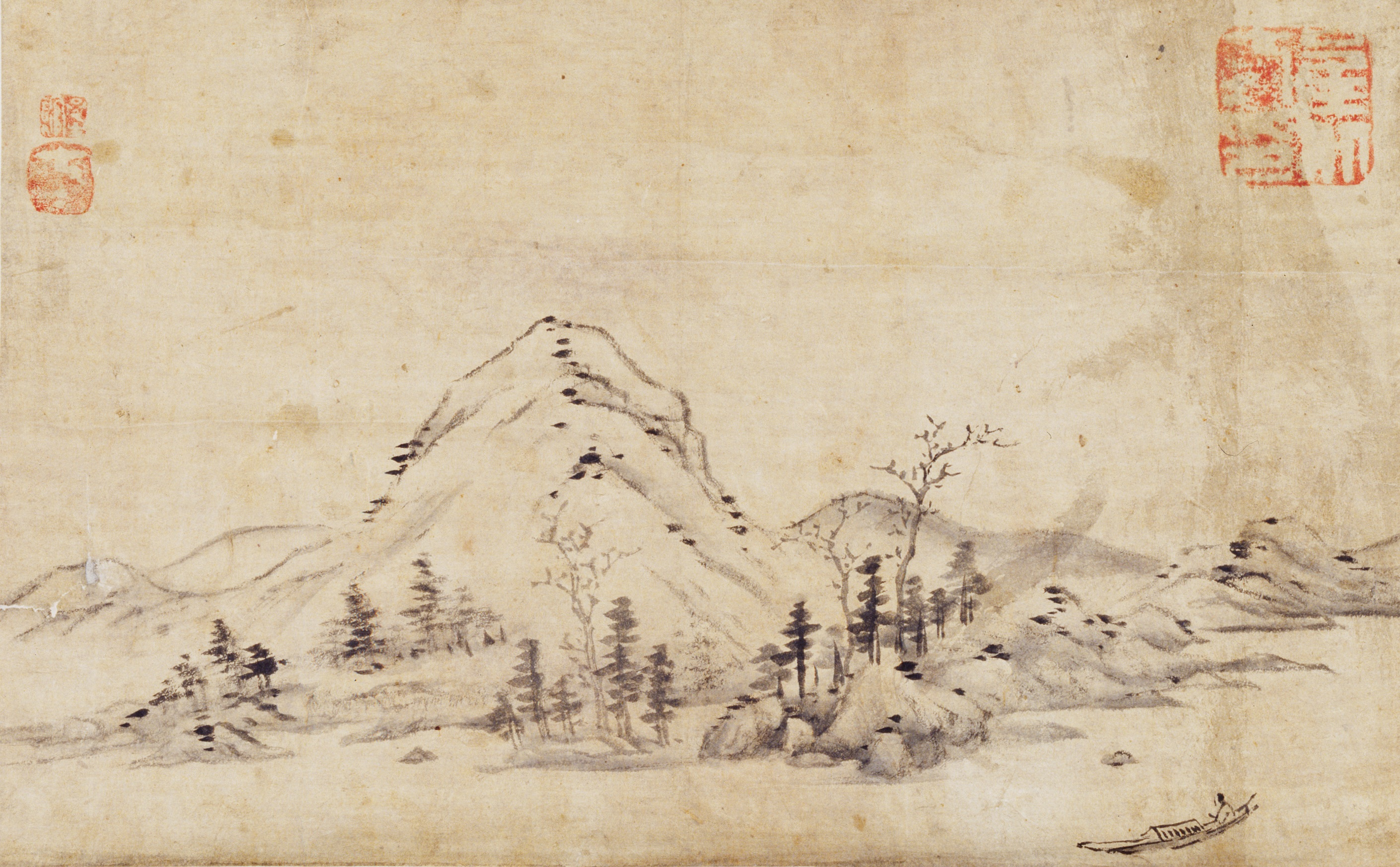

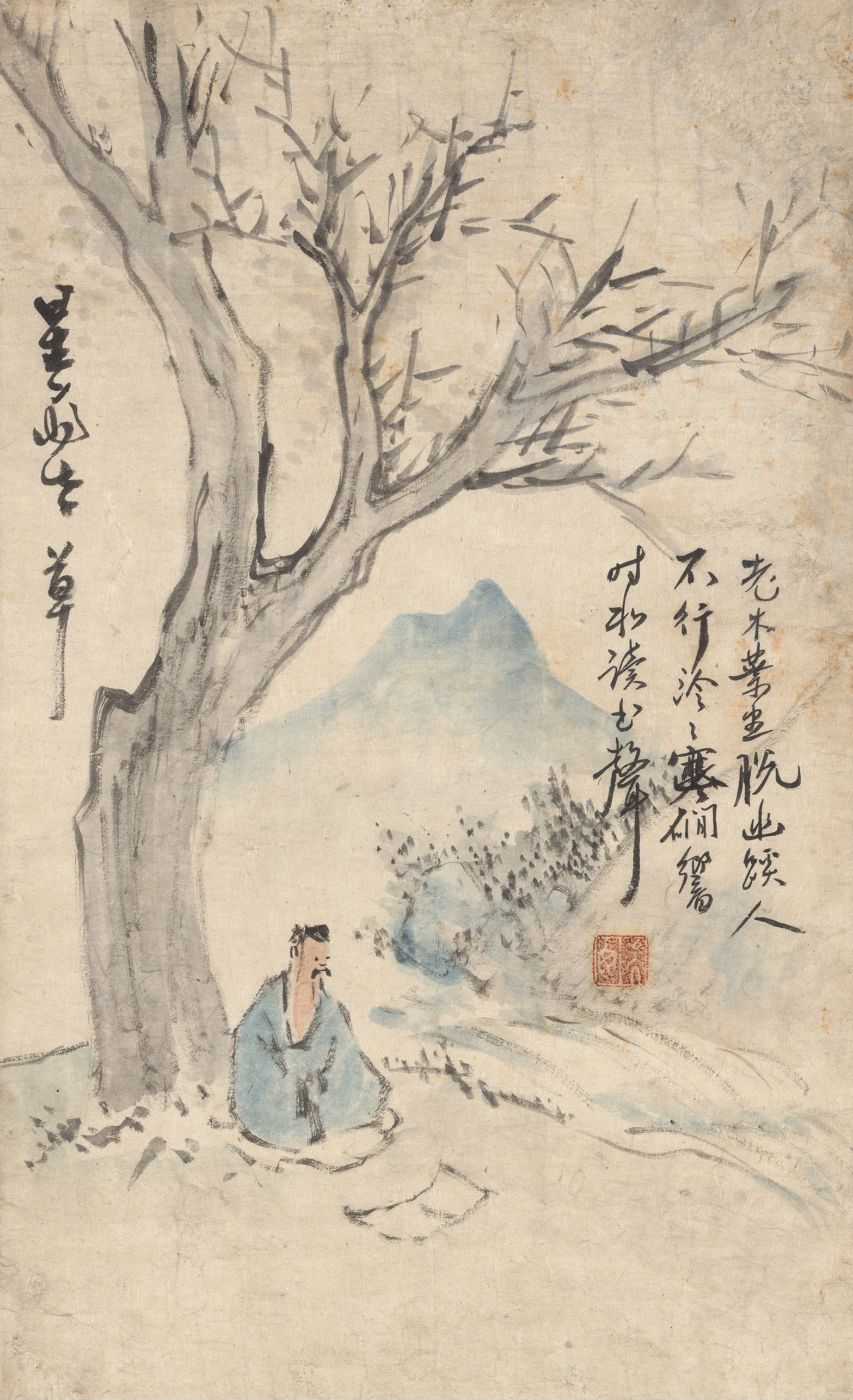

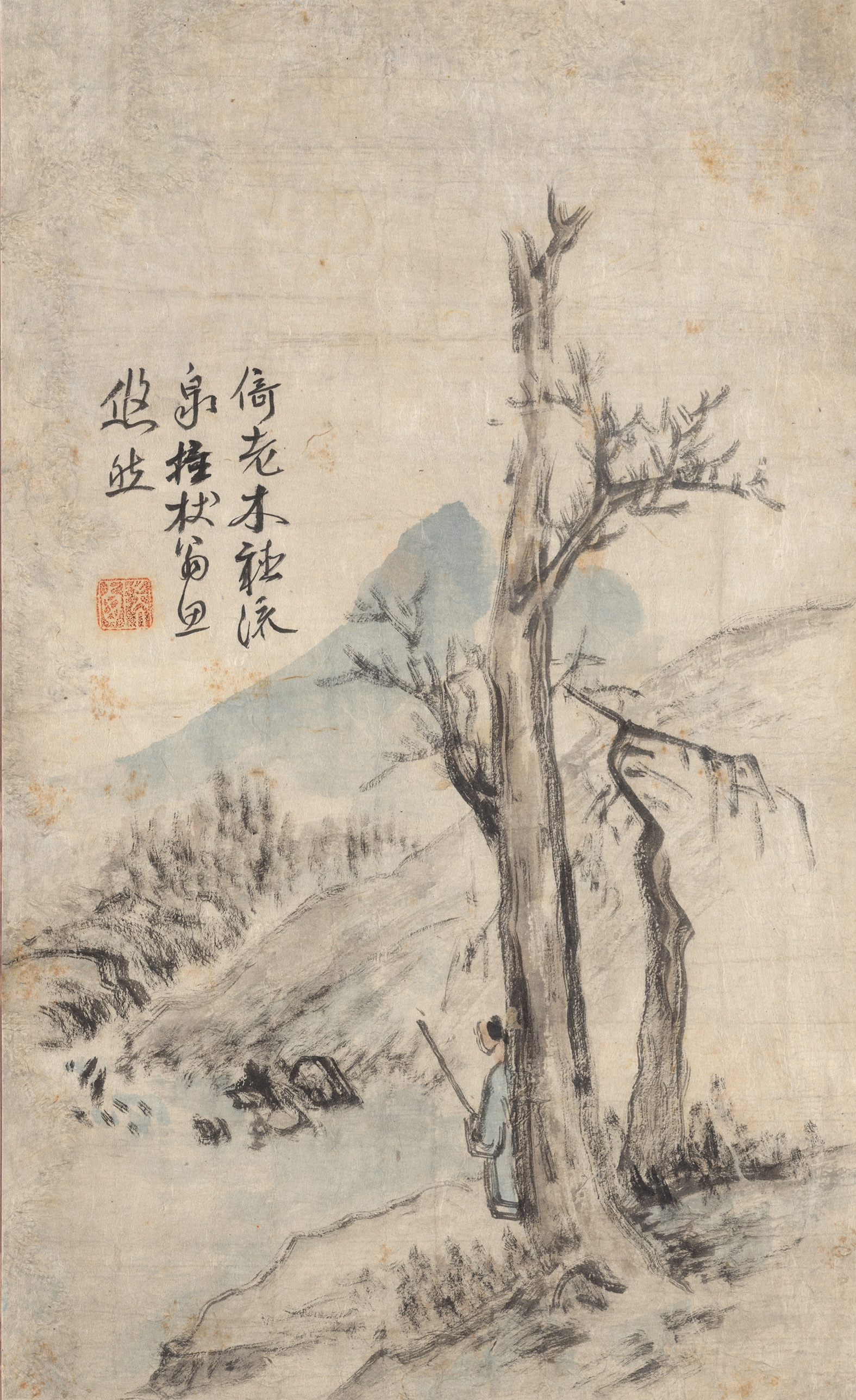

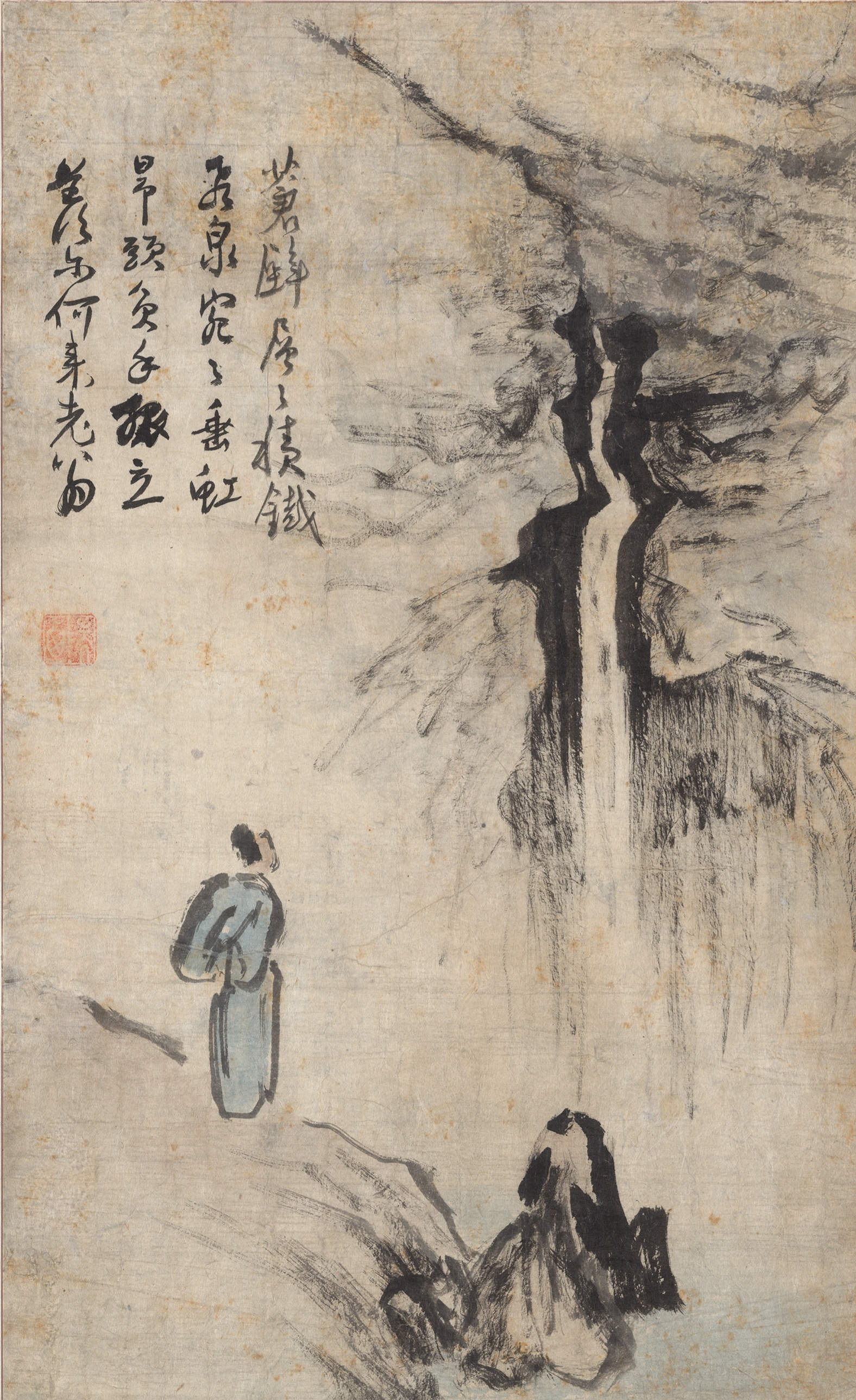

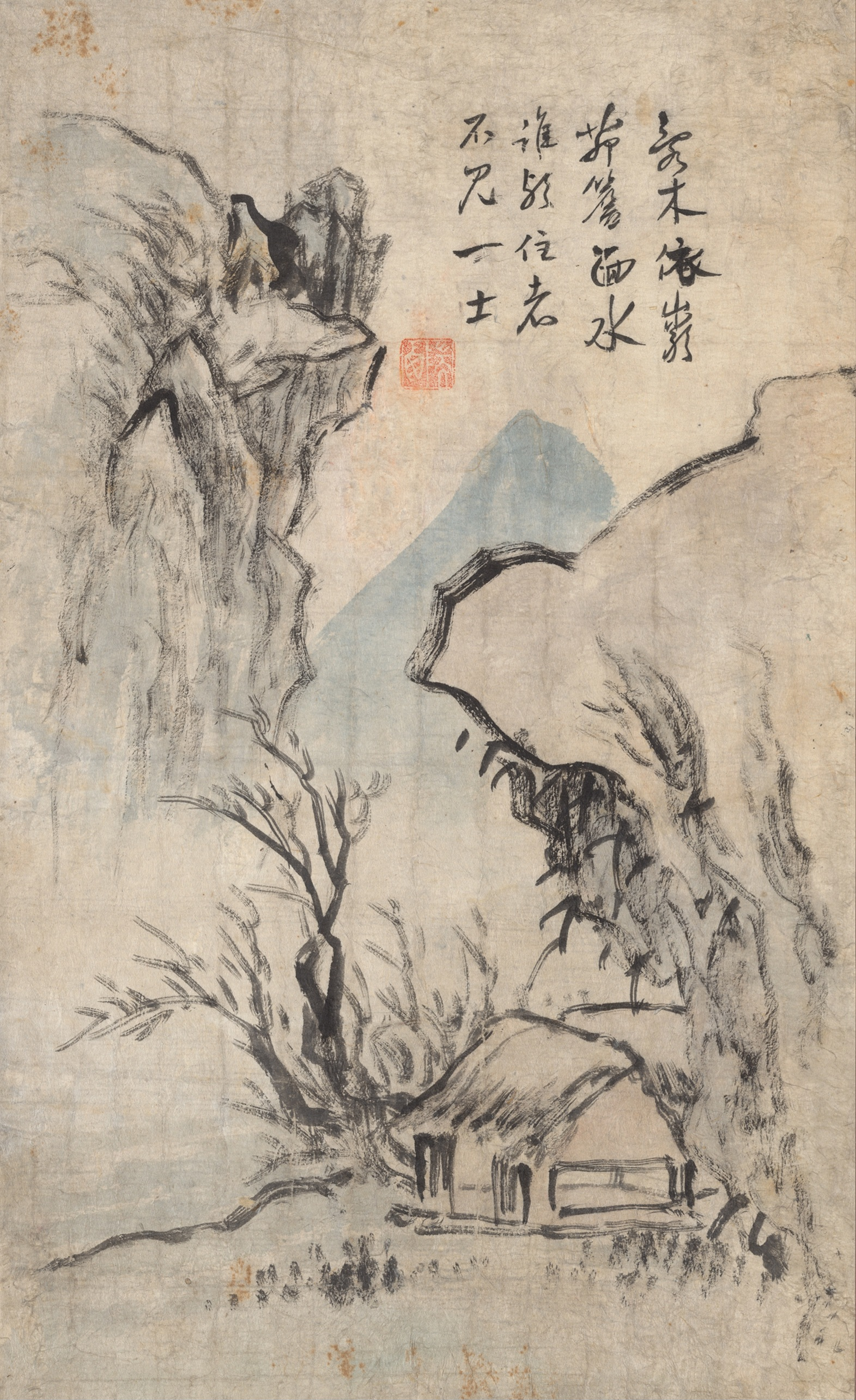

== See also ==
- Korean painting
- List of Korean painters
