= Puk =

Puk or PUK may refer to:

- Patriotic Union of Kurdistan (PUK), an Iraqi-Kurdish political party in Iraqi Kurdistan;
- Personal unblocking key, code for resetting the personal identification number on mobile devices;
- Buk (puk), a traditional Korean drum.
- A. J. Puk, American baseball player
- Ch'oe Puk, Korean Joseon-era painter
