= Yuchun =

The name Yuchun could refer to:

- Li Yuchun, a Chinese pop singer
- Park Yoo-chun, a Korean singer known as Yuchun
- Chang Yuchun, a general from the Ming dynasty
- My Girlfriend (YUCHUN from 東方神起), a 2008 pop single
- Yi Inmun, a painter also known as Yuchun
