= Sin Wi =

Korean painter (1769–1847)

- Hangul: 신위
- Hanja: 申緯
- RR: Sin Wi
- MR: Sin Wi

Art name
- Hangul: 자하, 경수당
- Hanja: 紫霞, 警修堂
- RR: Jaha, Gyeongsudang
- MR: Chaha, Kyŏngsudang

Courtesy name
- Hangul: 한수
- RR: Hansu
- MR: Hansu

Sin Wi (Korean: 신위, 1769 – 1847?), art names Jaha (자하) or Gyeongsudang (경수당), was a scholar official of the late Joseon period as well as an amateur-painter in the literati artistic style.

== Life and legacy ==
Born in Pyeongsan, he was attached to the embassy sent to China in 1813. He met Feng Fangkang (1733–1818), an authority in inscriptions on stone and bronze. Following the death of Crown Prince Hyomyeong in 1830, he was sent to exile, but later recalled. He was a progressive thinker, involved in the Sirhak movement.

His painting shows the influence of his teacher Kang Sehwang (1713–1791), and he was also a follower of Yun Sun (1680–1741).

He was well-renowned as a painter of bamboo. His landscape style has been described as simple but effective, as was his calligraphy.

== Gallery ==
Sin Wi left works in various fields such as paintings, calligraphy and poetry.

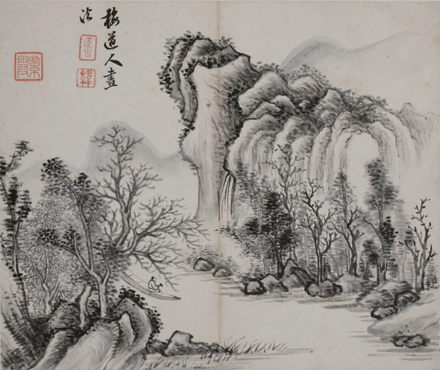
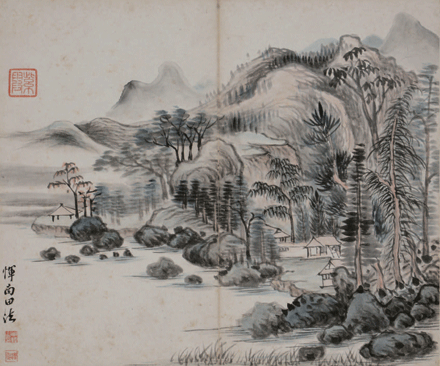
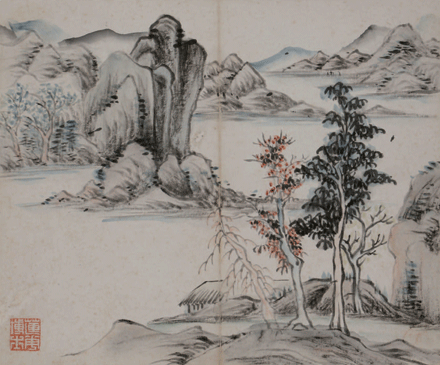
Landscapes
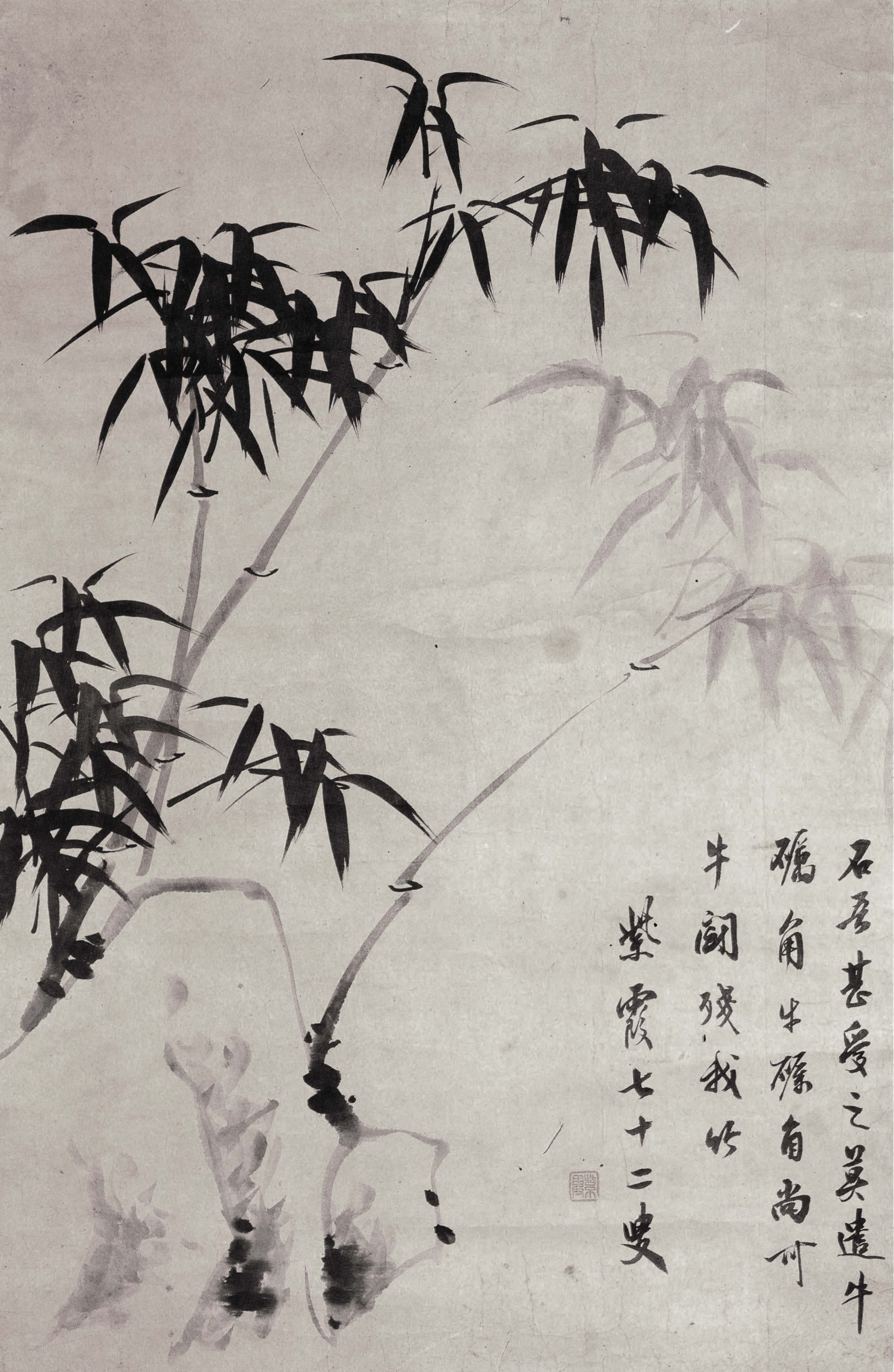
Seokjukdo 석죽도
Bamboos (1840)

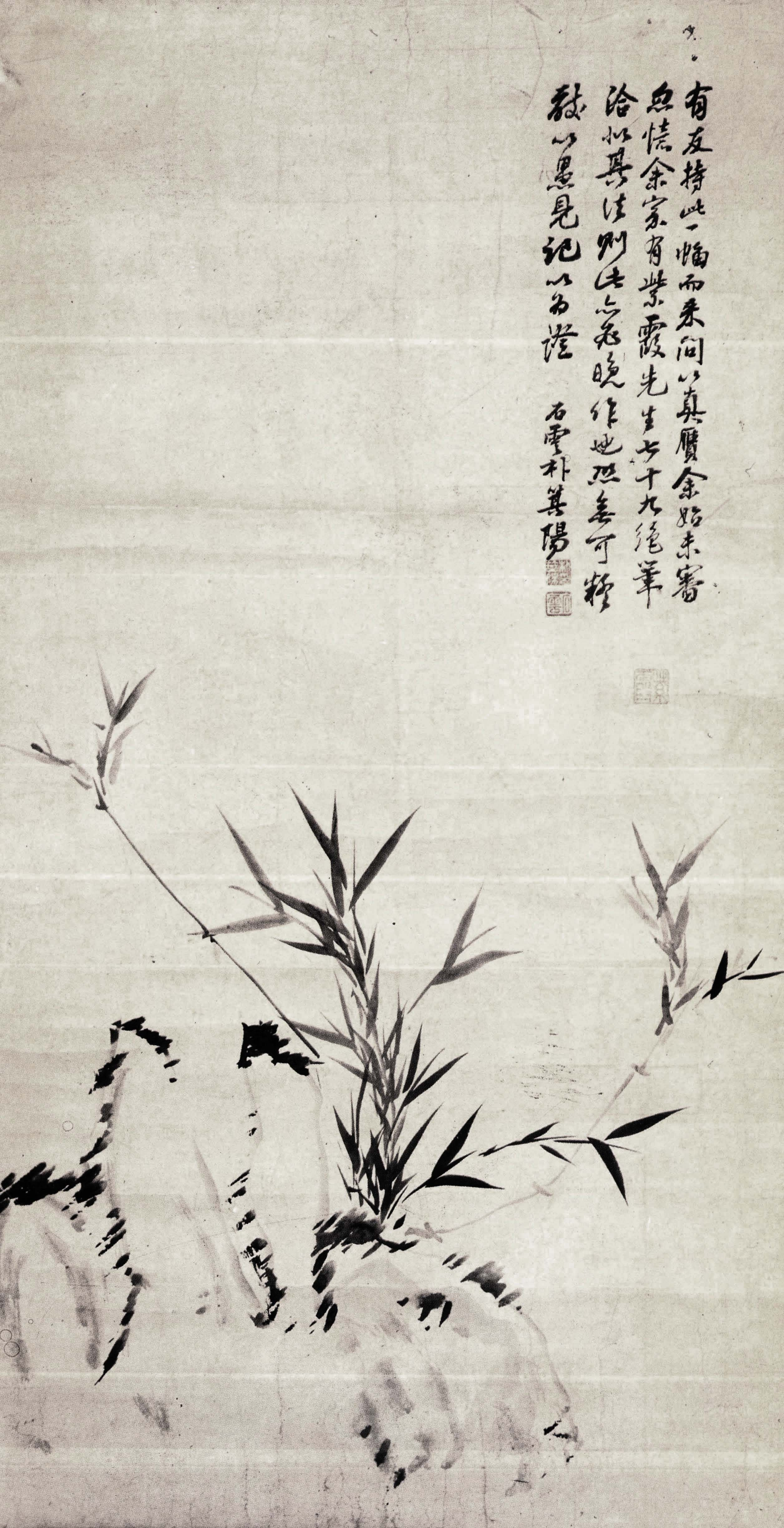
Seokjukdo 석죽도
Bamboos (1847)

The Korean Copyright Commission lists 18 paintings, 48 calligraphies, 7 moldings and 17 documents for Sin Wi, while Towooart gives a short notice.

== Bibliography ==
- Pratt, Keith L.; Rutt, Richard; Hoare, James E. (1999). Korea, A Historical and Cultural Dictionary. Durham East Asia Series. Routledge. p. 568. ISBN 978-0-7007-0463-7.
- Turner, Jane (2003). Grove Dictionary of Art. Oxford University Press, USA. p. 32600. ISBN 978-0-1951-7068-9.
- KCC (2013). "Sin Wi". Database (in Korean). Korean Copyright Commission.
- TWA (2013). "Sin Wi". Database (in Korean). Towooart.

== See also ==
- Korean painting
- List of Korean painters
- Korean art
