= Yi Hanch'ŏl =

Korean painter (fl. 19th century)

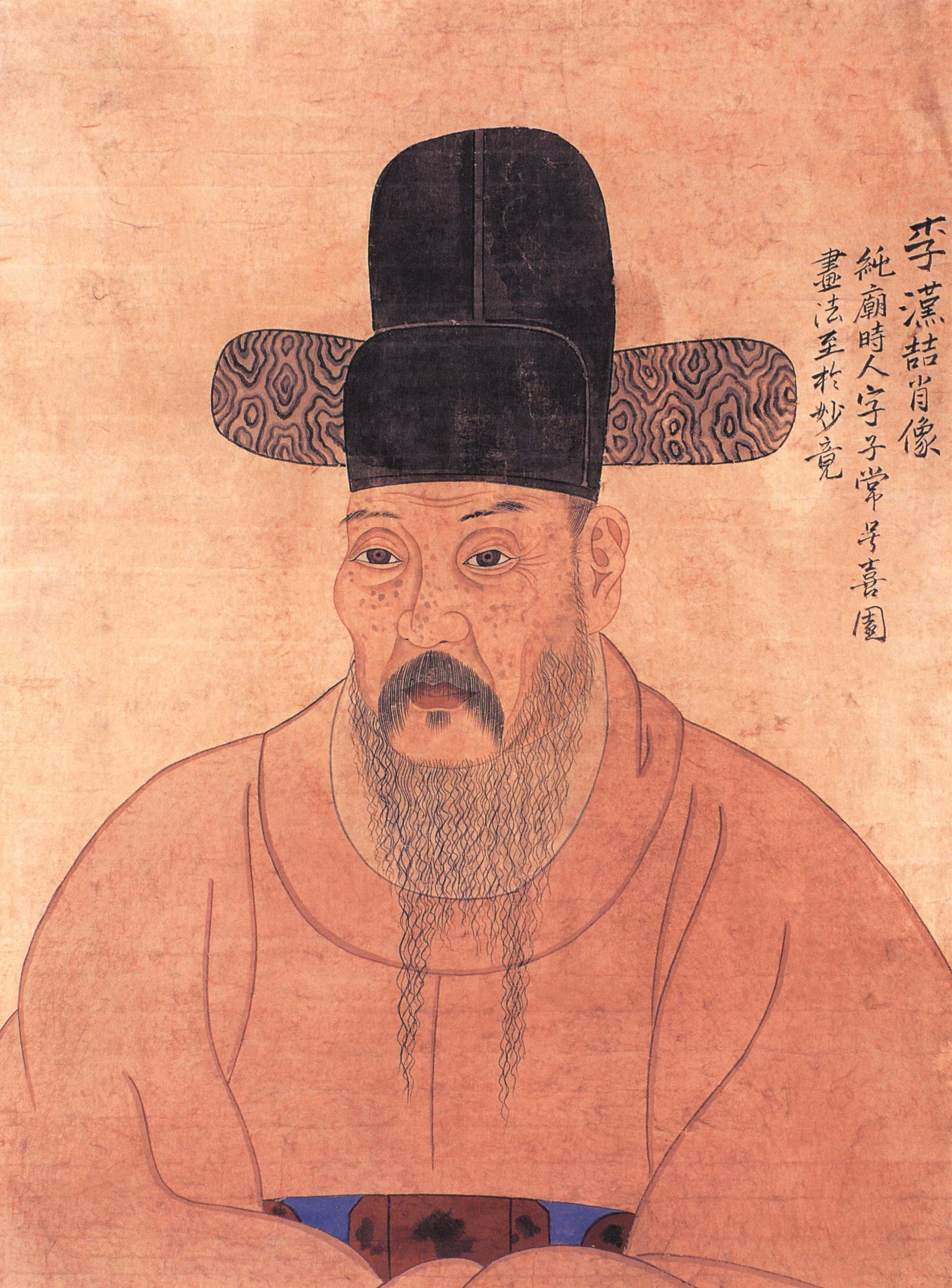

Korean name
- Hangul: 이한철
- Hanja: 李漢喆
- RR: I Hancheol
- MR: I Hanch'ŏl

Yi Hanch'ŏl (Korean: 이한철; Hanja: 李漢喆; 1808 – ?) was a painter of Joseon.

His era was the late period of the dynasty, during which the portrait of three kings were drawn by Yi: Heonjong, Cheoljong and Emperor Gojong. His works named himself the most fascinating portrait painter at the time.

Famed artists and scholar Kim Jeong-hui disciplined Yi with other artists including Yu Suk, Yu Jae-so, etc. Kim appreciated his drawing: the drawing of Yi lacked the forms but took hold of magnificent scenery with powerful but also transparent calligraphy.

Existing works show broad subjects such as scenery, figure, flowers and birds, whereas they abided by the way of Kim Hong-do in terms of describing the core images. His artistic style was said to be affected by Southern School.

One of his most valuable works is No.57 National Treasures of South Korea《The portrait of Kim Jung-hui》(1857, The National Museum of Korea), while other relics can be also found in Gansong Art Museum.

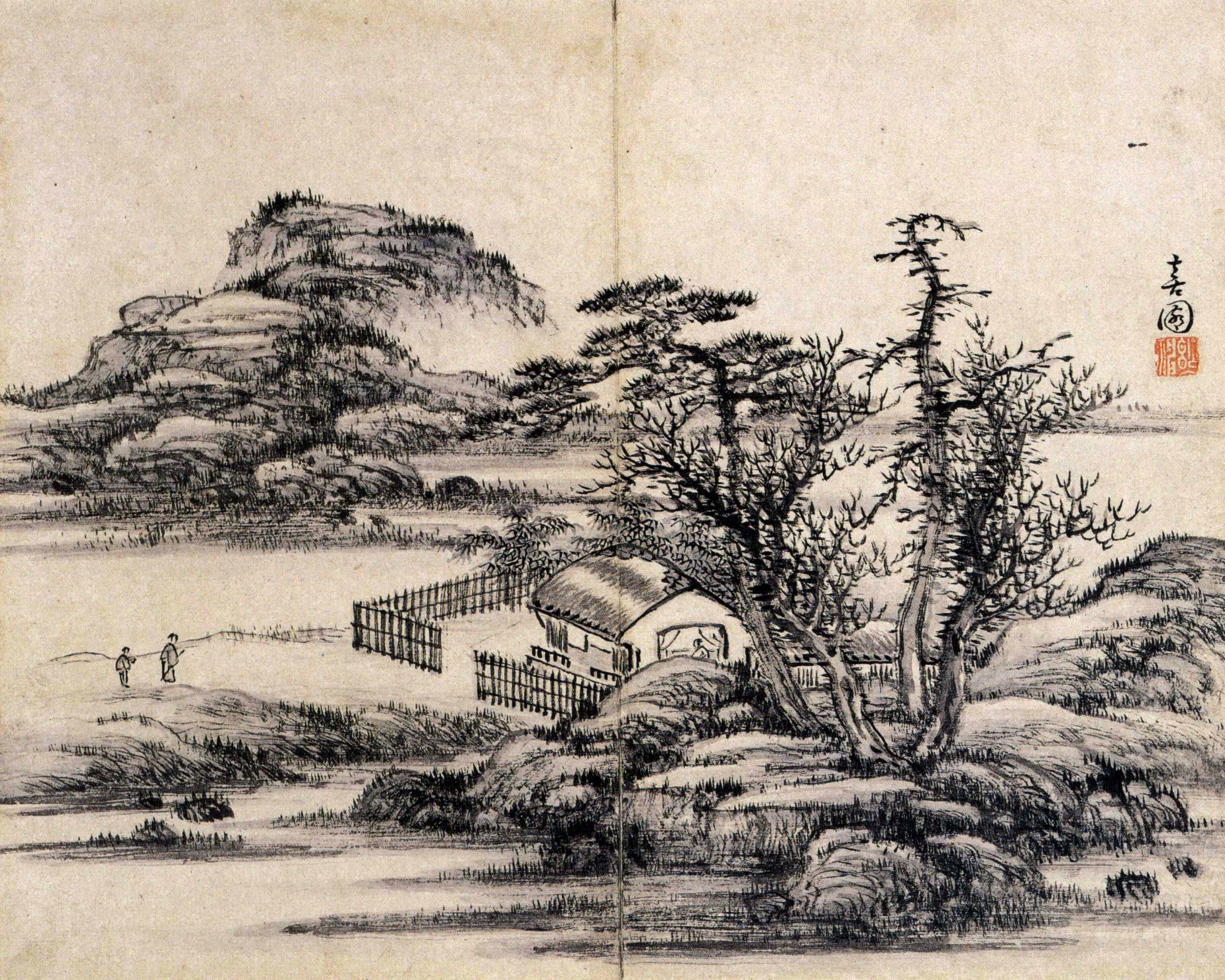
《강호한거도》

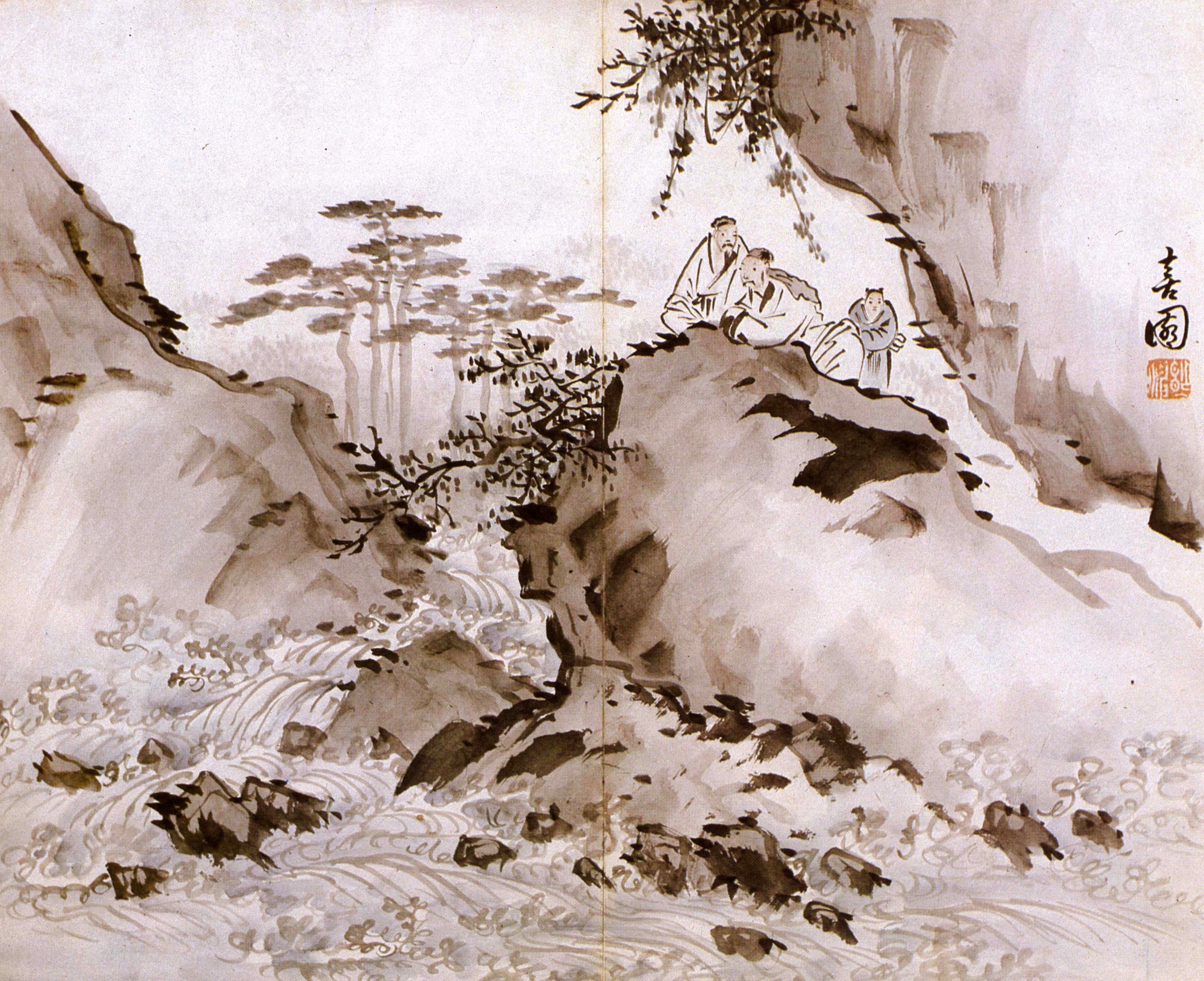
《의암관수도》
