= Kang Hŭian =

Korean scholar and painter (1417–1464)

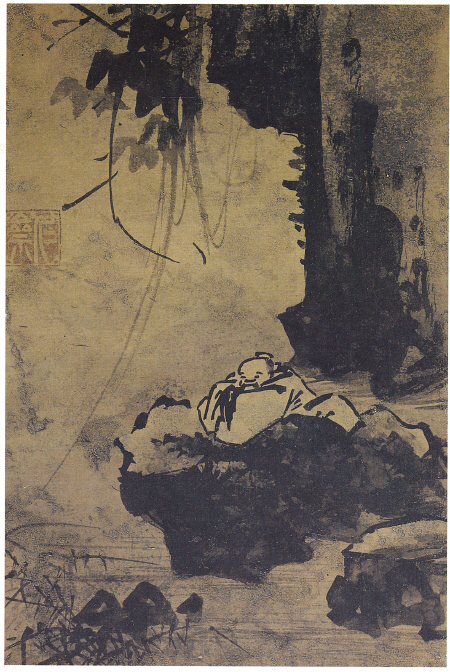
- “Gosagwansudo” (A seonbi (scholar) overlooking water from the high hill)

Korean name
- Hangul: 강희안
- Hanja: 姜希顔
- RR: Gang Huian
- MR: Kang Hŭian

Art name
- Hangul: 인재
- Hanja: 仁齋
- RR: Injae
- MR: Injae

Courtesy name
- Hangul: 경우
- RR: Gyeongu
- MR: Kyŏngu

Kang Hŭian (Korean: 강희안; c. 1417–1464), art name Injae, was a prominent scholar and painter of the early Joseon period. He was good at poetry, calligraphy, and painting. He entered royal service by passing gwageo in 1441 under the reign of king Sejong (1397–1418–1450).

== Birth Uncertainty ==
Kang Hŭian and his younger brother Kang Hŭimaeng were the sons of Kang Sŏktŏk (1395–1459) and cousins of king Munjong (1414–1450–1452), King Sejo (1417 –1455–1468) and Grand Prince Anpyeong 이용 안평대군 (1418–1453), that were the first three sons of king Sejong.

Nevertheless, the year of birth of Kang Hŭian is unclear. Part of the references say 1417, part of them say 1419... None of these sources ever mention this discrepancy. Britannica specifies the more precise 1417(태종 17)~1464(세조 10).

== Gallery ==
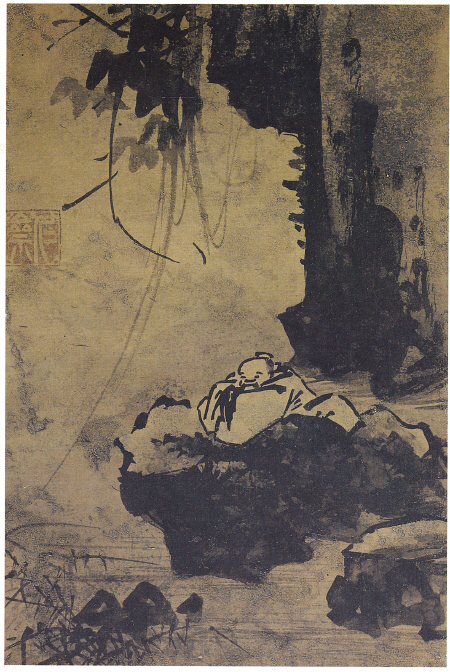
Gosagwansudo
고사관수도 (高士觀水圖)
Scholar gazing at
the running river

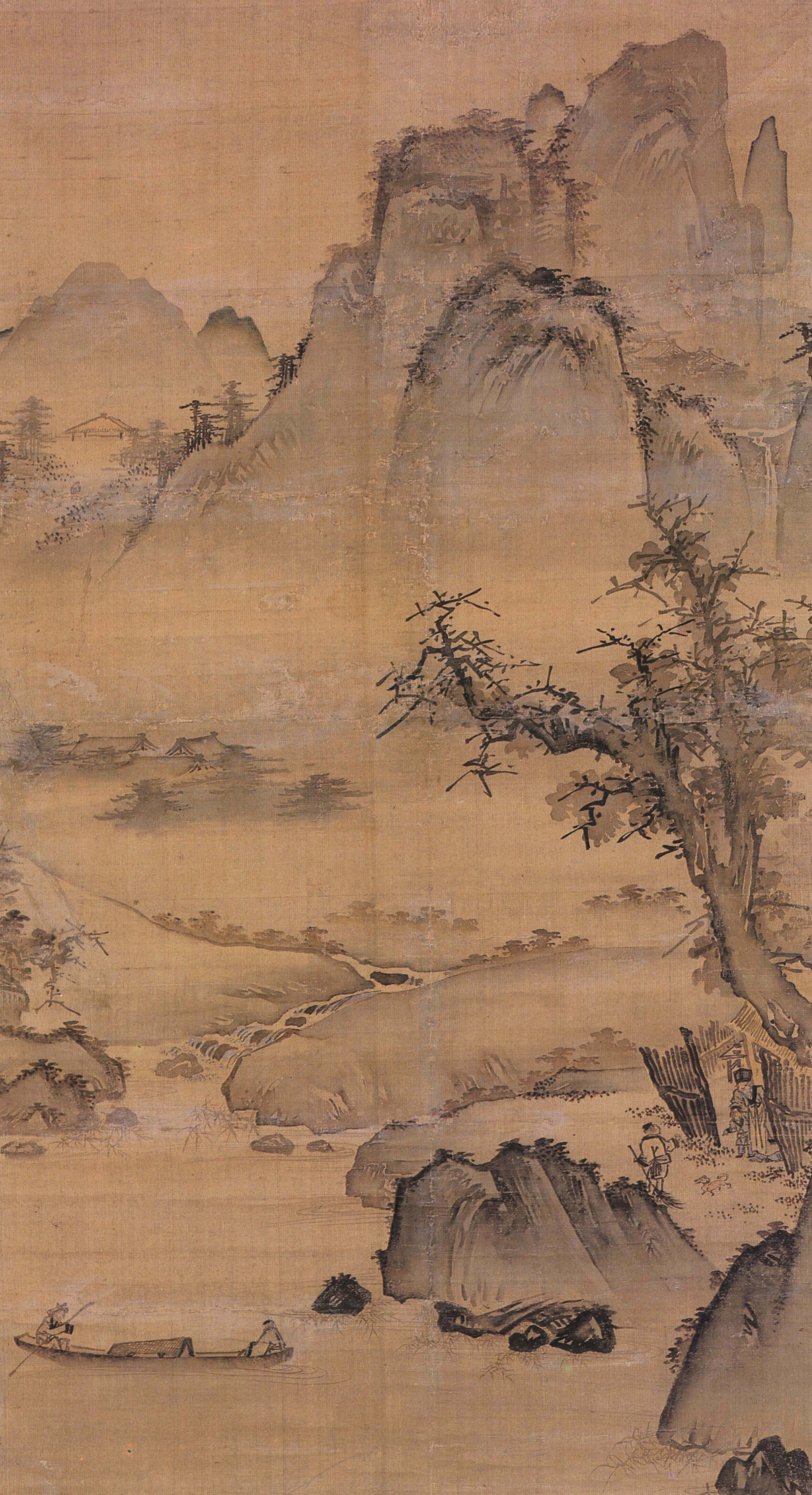
Sansudo 산수도
Landscape

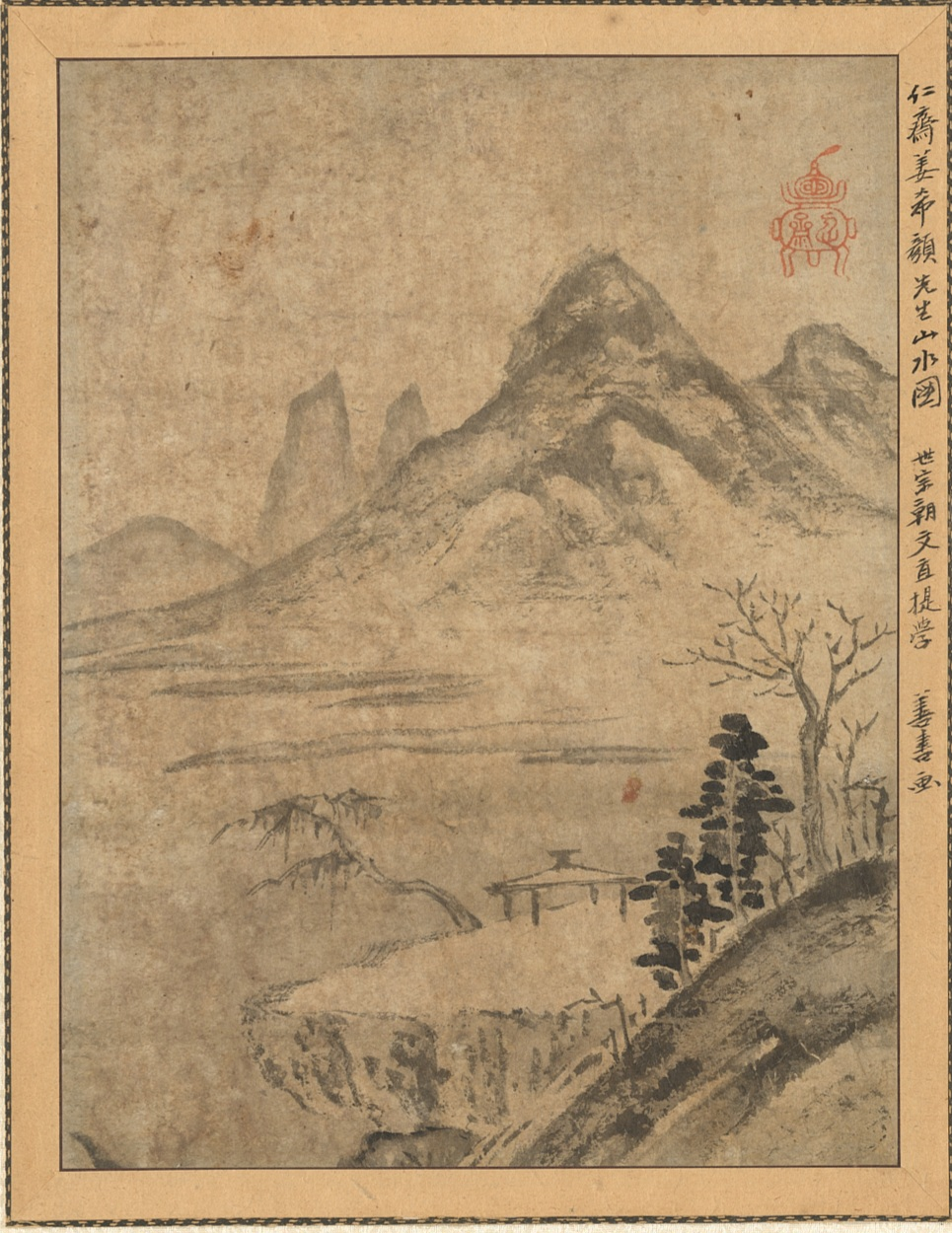
Sansu 산수

The Korean Copyright Commission lists five paintings for Kang Hŭian, while Towooart gives a short notice.

== See also ==
- List of Korean painters

== Bibliography ==
- Turner, Jane (2003). Grove Dictionary of Art. Oxford University Press, USA. p. 32600. ISBN 978-0-1951-7068-9.
- KCC (2013). "Kang Hŭian". Database (in Korean). Korean Copyright Commission.
- TWA (2013). "Kang Hŭian". Database (in Korean). Towooart.

== See also ==
- Korean painting
- List of Korean painters
- Korean art
- Korean culture
