= Kim Turyang =

- Hangul: 김두량
- Hanja: 金斗樑
- RR: Gim Duryang
- MR: Kim Turyang

Art name
- Hangul: 남리, 예천
- Hanja: 南里, 藝泉
- RR: Namri, Yecheon
- MR: Namni, Yech'ŏn

Courtesy name
- Hangul: 도경
- Hanja: 道卿
- RR: Dogyeong
- MR: Togyŏng

Kim Turyang (1696–1763), also known as Kim Du-ryang, was a painter of the mid Joseon period. He was the son of Gim Hyogyeong, a Hwawon (royal court painter). Kim Turyang followed his father's career by entering the royal service as a member of the Dohwaseo, the official painters of the Joseon court. He was good at almost all genres of painting, including muninhwa (painting in the literal artistic style, sansuhwa (landscape painting), yeongmohwa (animal-and-bird painting) and inmuhwa (portrait painting).

== Gallery ==
Towooart provides a short notice and an argumented selection of paintings.

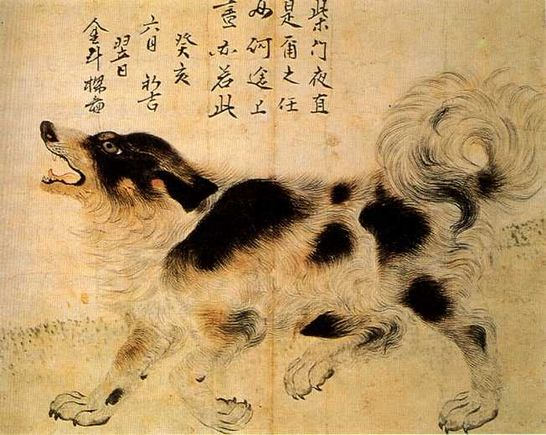
Sapsal dog

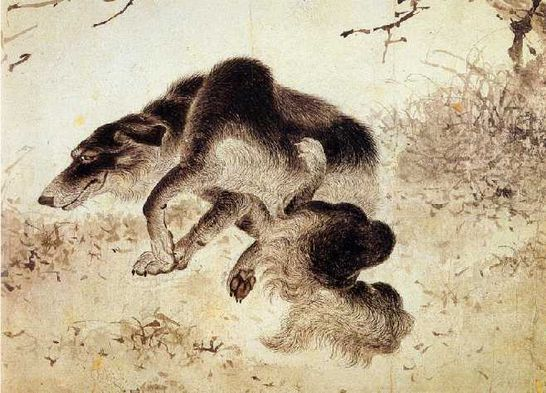
Scratching dog

== See also ==
- Korean painting
- List of Korean painters
- Korean art
- Korean culture

== Bibliography ==
To be changed

- Pratt, Keith L.; Rutt, Richard; Hoare, James E. (1999). Korea, A Historical and Cultural Dictionary. Durham East Asia Series. Routledge. p. 220. ISBN 978-0-7007-0463-7.
- Turner, Jane (2003). Grove Dictionary of Art. Oxford University Press, US. pp. T18-50. ISBN 978-0-1951-7068-9.
- KCC (2013). "Kim Du-ryang". Database. Korean Copyright Commission. (in Korean)
- TWA (2013). "Kim Du-ryang". Art Database. Towooart. (in Korean)
