= Kim Ŭnghwan =

Korean Painter

- Hangul: 김응환
- Hanja: 金應煥
- RR: Gim Eunghwan
- MR: Kim Ŭnghwan

Art name
- Hangul: 복헌, 담졸당
- Hanja: 復軒, 擔拙堂
- RR: Bokheon, Damjoldang
- MR: Pokhŏn, Tamjoltang

Courtesy name
- Hangul: 영수
- Hanja: 永受
- RR: Yeongsu
- MR: Yŏngsu

Kim Ŭnghwan (1742–1789), also known as Kim Eung-hwan, was a painter of the late Joseon period. He entered royal service as a member of the Dohwaseo, the official painters of the Joseon court. Kim Ŭnghwan is known for Danwon's teacher and good at sansuhwa (landscape painting).

== See also ==
- Korean painting
- List of Korean painters
- Korean art
- Korean culture
