= Nam Kyeu =

Korean painter (1811–1888)

- Hangul: 남계우
- Hanja: 南啓宇
- RR: Nam Gyeu
- MR: Nam Kyeu

Art name
- Hangul: 일호
- Hanja: 一濠
- RR: Ilho
- MR: Irho

Courtesy name
- Hangul: 일소
- Hanja: 逸少
- RR: Ilso
- MR: Ilso

Nam Kyeu (1811–1888) was a Korean painter and a government officer in the late Joseon period. Nam Kyeu was born to a high class and son of Nam Jinhwa who served as Busa. He lived in Namchon, Seoul and had an official career as Dojeong. Nam was especially good at depicting butterflies, so called as Nam Nabi (Butterfly Nam), his nickname. Through his lifetime, Nam Kyeu devoted to drawing pictures of butterflies and flowers.

== Gallery ==
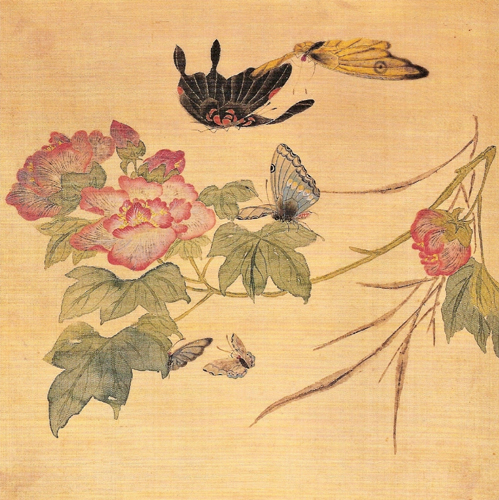
Hwajeopdo

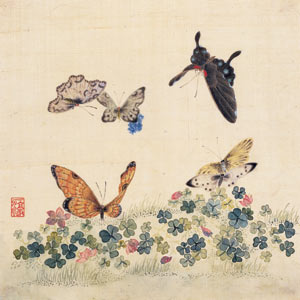
Hwajeopdo

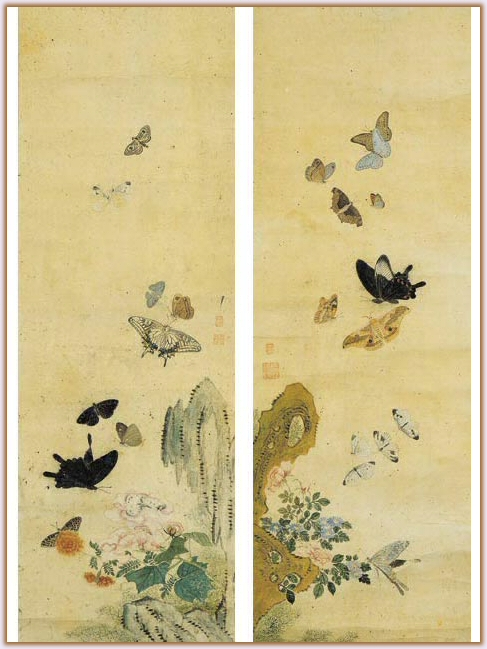
Hojeopdo

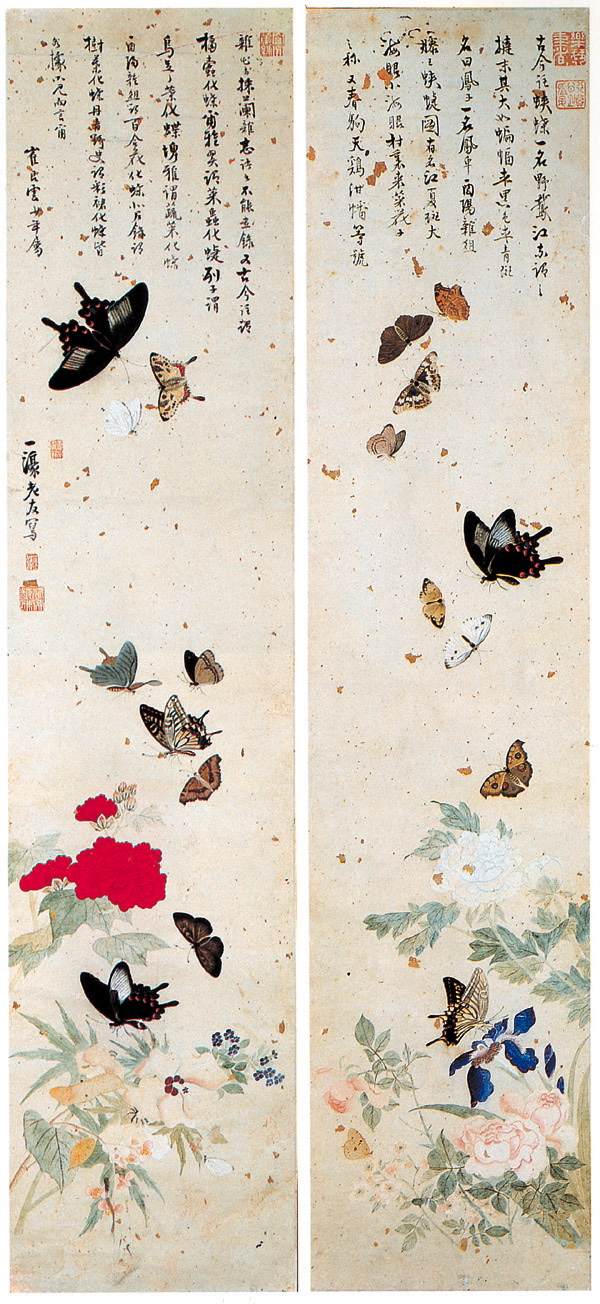
Gunjeopdo

== See also ==
- Korean painting
- List of Korean painters
- Korean art
- Korean culture
