= Yi Chaegwan =

- Hangul: 이재관
- Hanja: 李在寬
- RR: I Jaegwan
- MR: I Chaegwan

Art name
- Hangul: 소당
- Hanja: 小塘
- RR: Sodang
- MR: Sodang

Courtesy name
- Hangul: 원강
- Hanja: 元剛
- RR: Wongang
- MR: Wŏn'gang

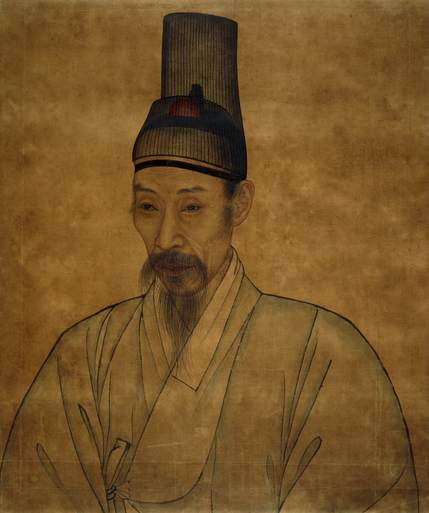
Portrait of a Confucian scholar by Yi Jaegwan, British Museum

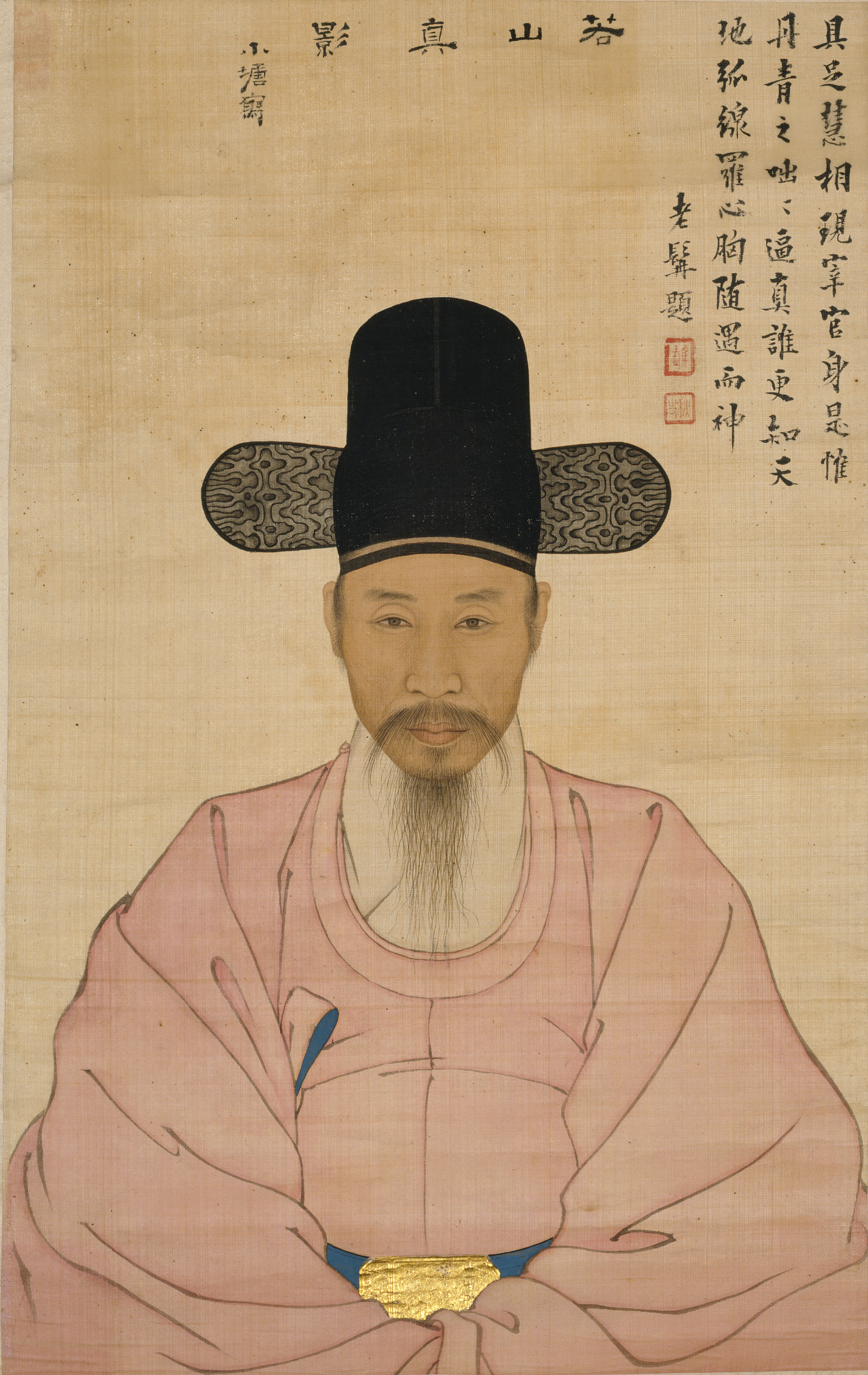
Portrait of Kang Io by Yi Jaegwan

Yi Chaegwan (Korean: 이재관; Hanja: 李在寬; 1783–1837) was a painter of the late Joseon period. Yi taught himself but excelled at almost all kind of genres in painting such as sansuhwa and inmulhwa.

== See also ==
- Korean painting
- List of Korean painters
- Korean art
- Korean culture
