= Ch'oe Susŏng =

Joseon painter (1487–1521)

- Hangul: 최수성
- Hanja: 崔壽峸
- RR: Choe Suseong
- MR: Ch'oe Susŏng

Ch'oe Susŏng (Korean: 최수성; Hanja: 崔壽峸; 1487–1521), was a scholar and painter of the early Joseon period. He was a poet, painter, calligrapher, and mathematician.

== Biography ==
Ch'oe was born on the west side of Gangneung, in the province of Gangwon Province. He studied poetry and calligraphy in Ulsan. His paintings depicted everyday scenes. When he was 35 years old, he was convicted and sent to prison where he eventually died. After his death, he received honors from the prime minister.

== See also ==
- Korean painting
- List of Korean painters
- Korean art
- Korean culture
