= Yi Am =

Korean painter (fl. 16th century)

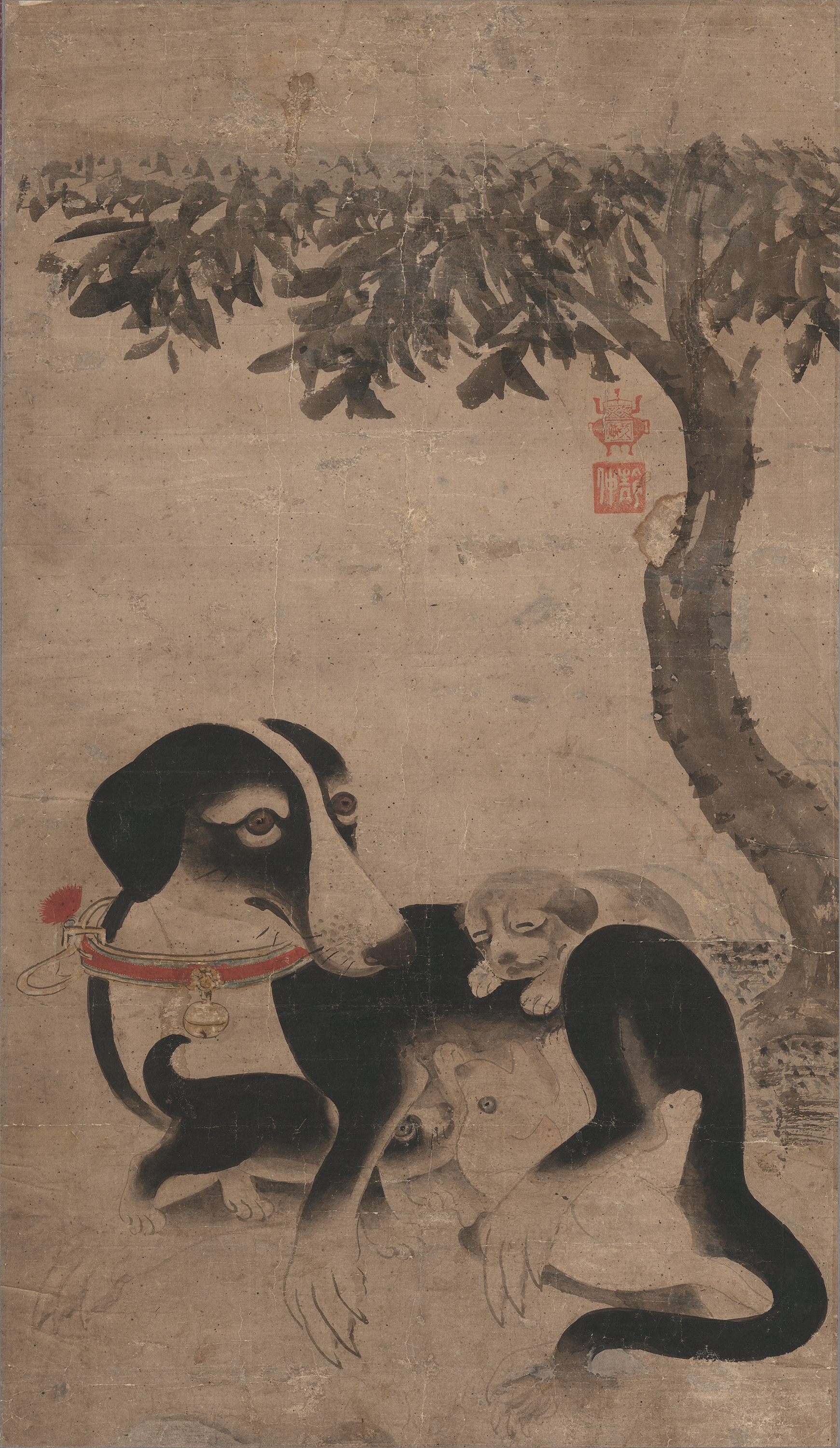
- Mother Dog and Puppies ("Mogyeon") by Yi Am.

Korean name
- Hangul: 이암
- Hanja: 李巖
- RR: I Am
- MR: I Am

Courtesy name
- Hangul: 정중
- Hanja: 靜仲
- RR: Jeongjung
- MR: Chŏngjung

Title
- Hangul: 두성령
- Hanja: 杜城令
- RR: Duseongnyeong
- MR: Tusŏngnyŏng

Yi Am (Korean: 이암; Hanja: 李巖, c. 1499 or 1507–1566) was a painter during the early- to mid-Joseon Dynasty.

As a literati court painter, Yi Am's works spanned portraiture, bird-and-flower and animal paintings. His extant paintings are famous for their unique depictions of animals, particularly dogs. He used washes of ink instead of distinct lines to define the animal bodies, a method that heavily influenced future Joseon bird-and-flower paintings. This influence spread to Japan as well; Tawaraya Sōtatsu's paintings of puppies with a similar technique have been considered a possible starting point for the development of the Rinpa school tarashikomi. The themes of natural harmony and familial love in Yi Am's animal paintings also influenced later Korean painters Byeon Sang-byeok and Kim Sik.

== Biography ==
Yi's date of birth is disputed. Sources indicate 1499 or 1507. He was the great-grandson of the fourth son of Sejong the Great, Grand Prince Imyeong and a cousin of Yi Jeong, another painter in the House of Yi. He was bestowed the rank title of Duseongnyeong by the king.

== Career ==
He was a renowned painter and contemporary of Sin Saimdang, alongside whom he was named as one of the five most famed literati painters at the time in the P’aegwan chapki. Yi's privileged descent allowed him access to Southern Song paintings that he studied as well as royal animals that he observed and painted. The degree of fidelity to the animals' natural appearances reflect the closeness that Yi could afford to have with royal pedigree hounds and captive hawks.

Yi also painted human portraits. On January 15, 1545, he was invited to paint a posthumous portrait of King Jungjong of Joseon.

In 2003, his painting, Hwajogujado (Flowers, Birds, and Puppies), the first Joseon painting depicting dogs, was designated a National Treasure of South Korea.

== See also ==
- An Gyeon
- Jeong Seon
- Gim Hongdo
