= Kang Sehwang =

Joseon dynasty painter (1713–1791)

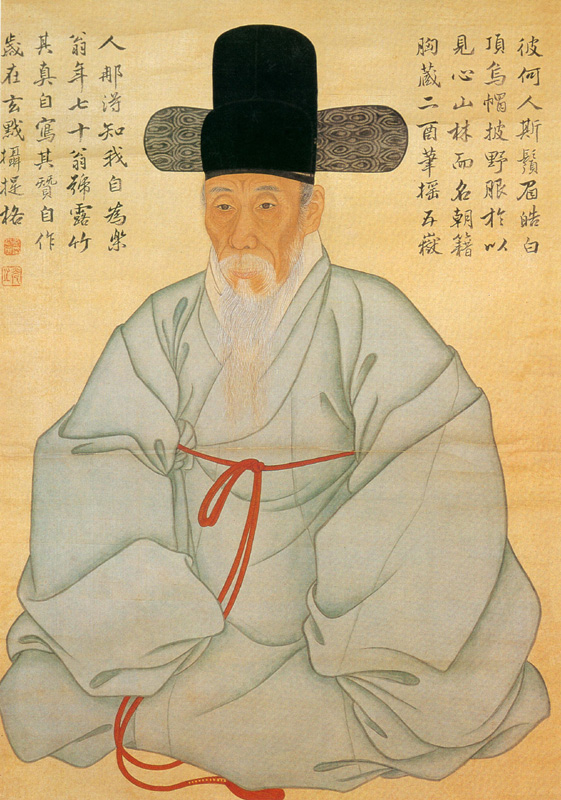
- Self portrait of Kang Sehwang

Korean name
- Hangul: 강세황
- Hanja: 姜世晃
- RR: Gang Sehwang
- MR: Kang Sehwang

Art name
- Hangul: 표암, 첨재
- Hanja: 豹菴
- RR: Pyoam, Cheomjae
- MR: P'yoam, Ch'ŏmjae

Courtesy name
- Hangul: 광지
- Hanja: 光之
- RR: Gwangji
- MR: Kwangji

Kang Sehwang (Korean: 강세황; Hanja: 姜世晃; 1713–1791) was a high government official but also a representative painter, calligrapher and art critic of the mid Joseon period. He was born in Jinju, South Gyeongsang Province, the son of Kang Hyŏn. He entered royal service at over sixty years old. Kang pursued and established muninhwa ("paintings by people of culture", referring to the Korean seonbi or literati upper-class) with his own creativity. He helped to develop the 'true view' style of painting and was a teacher of Kim Hongdo.

== Gallery ==
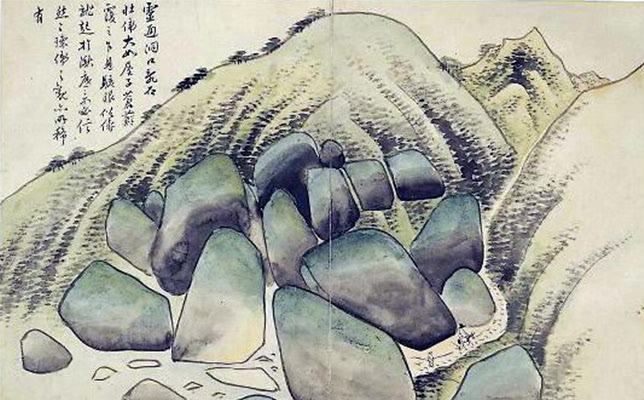
Yeongtong donggudo

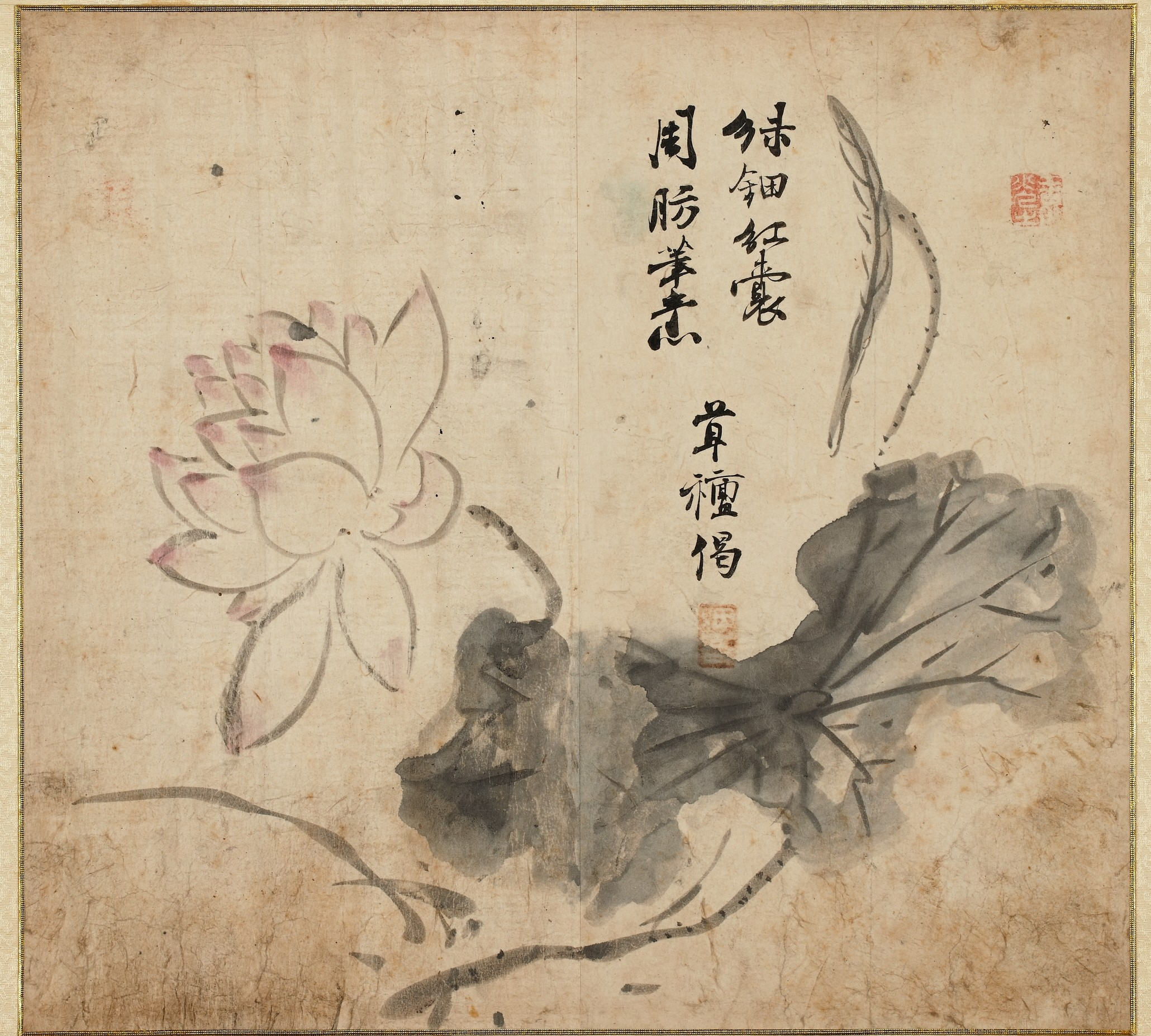
Yeonhwado (Painting of a lotus flower), National Museum of Korea

== See also ==
- Korean painting
- List of Korean painters
- Korean art
- Korean culture
