= Dong-shin Bae =

South Korean painter (1920–2008)

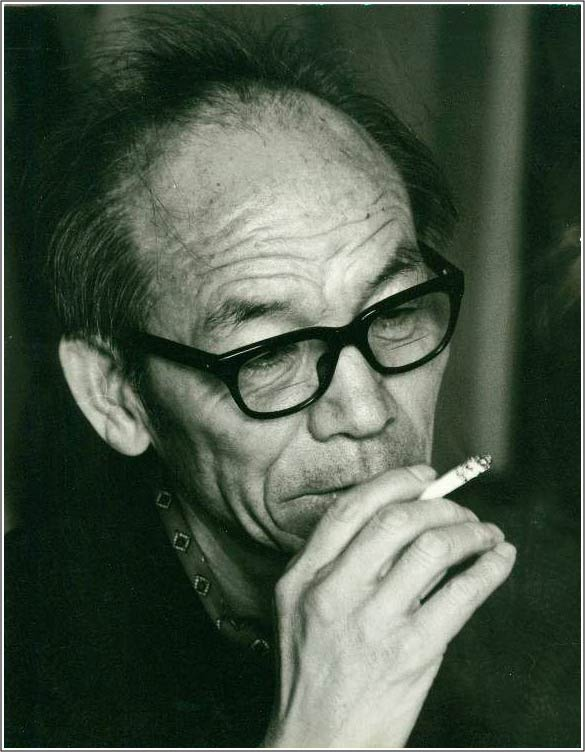
- 1920~2008 Korean Artist
- Born: 16 June 1920; GwangJu-si, Jeollanam-do, Korea
- Died: 10 December 2008 (aged 88)
- Education: Kawabada Art School, in Japan
- Occupation: Painter Watercolor
- Spouse: Yeon-gyu Kim
- Children: Hooranky Bae, Kyeongja Bae
- Website: https://sites.google.com/view/dongshinbae

Dong-shin Bae (Korean: 배동신, June 16, 1920 – December 10, 2008) was a Korean artist and watercolor painter. He was a Western painter of Japanese Joseon and South Korea. In 1937, at the age of 17, he went to Japan to study art. In 1943, he graduated from the Department of Western Painting at the Kawabata Art School in Japan. He debuted Japan through the "Japan Free Artists Association". After liberation, he continued his artistic activities in the region for the development of watercolor, which had not been noticed in Korea. It is evaluated that he has a unique style of painting that adjusted his Parisian style to a Japanese style.

== Early life ==
Bae Dong-shin was born as the third son between Seong-jae Bae and Ok-jin Cho, who run an herbal medicine clinic. There were two older brothers and one younger brother and two younger sisters. However, Dong-shin Bae's biological mother was Ok-hee Cheon.

Dong-shin's father, was away busy traveling he taught his young son Dong-shin to do or teach the medicines he should do when he was away. His father wanted Dong-shin to succeed the family business and trained his son, Dong-shin, who liked to read and while looking at picture books. The basics of oriental medicine is to learn the shape and properties of plants, animals, and natural elements that become medicinal. Dong-shin Bae had to look at the encyclopedia, draw it as it is, transcribing it in Chinese, and learn hieroglyphs, which are Chinese. Observing, drawing, and writing naturally led the Dong-shin Bae to the path of painting.

== Career ==
1937, he went to Japan to study art. In 1943, he graduated from the Department of Western Painting at Kawabata Art School in Japan. In 1943, he became a member of the Japan Free Artists Association. 1944, returned home. 1945, Liberation. He opened his first solo exhibition in Gwangju in 1947. In 1950, the Korean War broke out. In 1964, 1967, and 1969, he held a solo exhibition of watercolor paintings in Jeolla-do. Dong-shin Bae held 26 solo exhibitions in his life. He held solo exhibitions in Seoul, Tokyo and Osaka. In 1968 he became the first president of the Watercolor Creators Association. In 1970, he created an art group called "Hwangtohoe" with Oh Ji-ho, Park Chul-gyo, Kang Yeon-gyun, Woo Je-Gil, Kim Young-Tae, Choi Yong-gap, Kim In-Gyu, Kang Dong-moon, Kim Soo-ho. And he was invited as major members of the 1972 Gusang-jeon. In 1975, he served as the first president of the Korea Watercolor Association. Since 1973, it has been invited to the National Museum of Contemporary Art every year. In 1998, an exhibition was held in his hometown of Gwangju to commemorate Bae Dong-shin's 60 years of watercolor painting. In 2000, he was awarded the Korea Archives of Culture Medal

== Review ==
- In the August 1973 issue of ShinDongA, art critic Lee Kyung-seong said, “In the barren Korean watercolor group, the existence of Dong-shin Bae is absolutely essential. Of course, the place he listed as an author was in a foreign country called Japan. Here, he studied the technique and spirit of watercolor newly accepted from Europe, and started his path as a writer by getting along with them. He was honest and clean in nature, and he was a so-called Ecole de Parisian artist, who did not know the desire of water. Therefore, his life is truly a continuation of the pure lives of artists. He made many friends, made works, and has existed as such a writer. In a word, the world of painter Dong-shin Bae's work is based on a large scale, refined technology, and sophisticated colors. The direct and bold composition and the speedy movement of the brush are the source of the charm of his work."
- In 1982, at that time, Bae Dong-shin was introduced as "The Number One in Korean Watercolors" in the daily newspaper "Daily Sports" which introduces famous Korean art, culture, sports and entertainment.
- In 1986, the famous Korean economic daily "Maeil Business Newspaper" introduced Dong-shin Bae as "the absolute being of Korean watercolors."
- In 1990, Korean Air published an in-flight magazine (Quarterly) and introduced Dong-Shin Bae to travelers visiting Korea in the subtitle "BELLES-LETTRES, THEIR SOURCES IN KOREA TODAY".

== Gallery ==
Drawing charcoal

Watercolor Painting

== Activity area ==
South Jeolla Province, Boseong, Naju, Gwangju, Tokyo, Osaka, Seoul, Yeosu.
