= Meena Park =

South Korean visual artist (born 1973)

Meena Park (Korean: 박미나; born 1973) is a South Korean contemporary artist. She was born in Seoul. Her painting work focuses on using traditional techniques to portray contemporary visual culture. It explores the relationship between socially existing images, signs, and colours. Her work has been described as "dingbat paintings" and investigates the gaps between language and meaning. Park usually conceptualizes information as a separate entity from its material form, thereby analyzing societal systems and their impact on art. Through her "Colour-Lind-Band" and "Scream" series, she asks viewers to reconsider their perceptions of art in the context of modern society.

Park is member in the project collective "SMSM" with fellow artist Sasa[44] and designers Choi Sulki and Choi Sung Min, also known as Sulki & Min. Founded in 2009, the collective has created a variety of collaborative work which takes "the notion of health and happiness for the subject matter" and "deliberate emphasis on the aspects of 'applied art' or practicalities for the nature of work."

== Biography ==
Meena Park was born in 1973 in Seoul, South Korea. She explores the blend of painting and realism, emphasizing the interplay of signs and signifiers in her artwork. Park works for multifunctional paintings and collection paintings, which are designed for both aesthetic and functional purposes within contemporary living spaces, particularly in the Orange Painting and South Korea's high-rise apartments. Her work has been featured in various exhibitions, including "Rama Lama Ding Dong" at Atelier Hermès, where she further explored the connections between color, shape, and contemporary culture.

The semi-retrospective exhibition SMSM10 (2009) was held at Audio Visual Pavilion for the tenth anniversary of SMSM. It explores on the notion of time in relation to the mottos of the Republic of Korea, Seoul, Gwangju, and the National Museum. It reflects on the collective's practice in investigating "the visual apparatuses, messages, forms, and structures from the reality of Korea."

The dual exhibition CV: MeeNa Park & Sasa[44] (2023-24) was held at the Art Archives of Seoul Museum of Art to revisit the collaborative work of the two artists, who are known for their experimental relational practice. It aims to reconstruct and combine two decades of their individual and collective exhibitions. The exhibition is divided into two sections: “Exhibition Record” contains over 140 early representative works by the two artists, while “Bibliography” features a book and a sound installation consisting of 1,259 articles about them.
