= Hwang Kich'ŏn =

Korean painter (1760–1821)

Hwang Kich'ŏn (Korean: 황기천, 1760–1821) was a Korean painter of the late Joseon period. He had several pen names, including Ch'angwŏn (昌原), Hŭido (羲圖), Nŭngsan (菱山), and Huwan (后晥).

== Family ==
Hwang's great-grandfather was Hwang Yusa (黃有師). His paternal grandfather was Hwang Ch'ae (黃寀) and his maternal grandfather was Min Paekbok (閔百福). His biological father was Hwang Injo (黃仁照), his father was Hwang Inyŏng (鐵原鎭兵馬僉節制使 - 黃仁煐), and his brother was Hwang Kisŏng (黃基性).

== Career ==
In 1792, he passed his first governmental examination (壬子 式年試 生員), Class 2, Category 13. In 1794, he passed his liberal arts examination (甲寅 庭試 丙科), Category 17.

Hwang was promoted to the government position Rank 6 (六品) and became Minister of the Interior (吏曹正郞) without first filling the Ch'unghwan position (淸宦職).

In 1801, Hwang received the positions of Munsarang (問事郞), Kangdong Governor (江東縣監), Judge (正言), Chip'yŏng (持平), and Chongbusijŏng (宗簿寺正). In 1806, after not attending a government meeting to impeach the second vice-premier, Kim Talsun (金達淳), he was exiled to Yongcheon (龍川) and then transferred to Gogeumdo (古今島), but in 1809, he was pardoned due to the birth of Ikjong (翼宗).

In 1820, he was appointed governor of Gyeongsang Province, but soon thereafter, he resigned.

== Writing ==
He was talented in sentence construction and traditional (篆書), simplified (隷書), cursive (楷書), and hand-written (草書) calligraphy.

Hwang wrote an afterword for a text called The Record of Remnant Subjects of the Imperial Dynasty, which contained histories of families whose ancestors had emigrated to Joseon from Ming China.
