= Kim Tŭksin =

Korean painter (1754–1822)

- Hangul: 김득신
- Hanja: 金得臣
- RR: Gim Deuksin
- MR: Kim Tŭksin

Art name
- Hangul: 긍재, 홍월헌
- Hanja: 兢齋, 弘月軒
- RR: Geungjae, Hongwolheon
- MR: Kŭngjae, Hongwŏrhŏn

Courtesy name
- Hangul: 현보
- Hanja: 賢輔
- RR: Hyeonbo
- MR: Hyŏnbo

Kim Tŭksin (1754–1822) was the son of a royal court painter, Kim Eungri, and followed in his father's footsteps. He entered royal service as a member of the Dohwaseo, the official painters of the Joseon court. Kim Deuk-sin is known for his pungsokhwa along with Danwon.

== Gallery ==
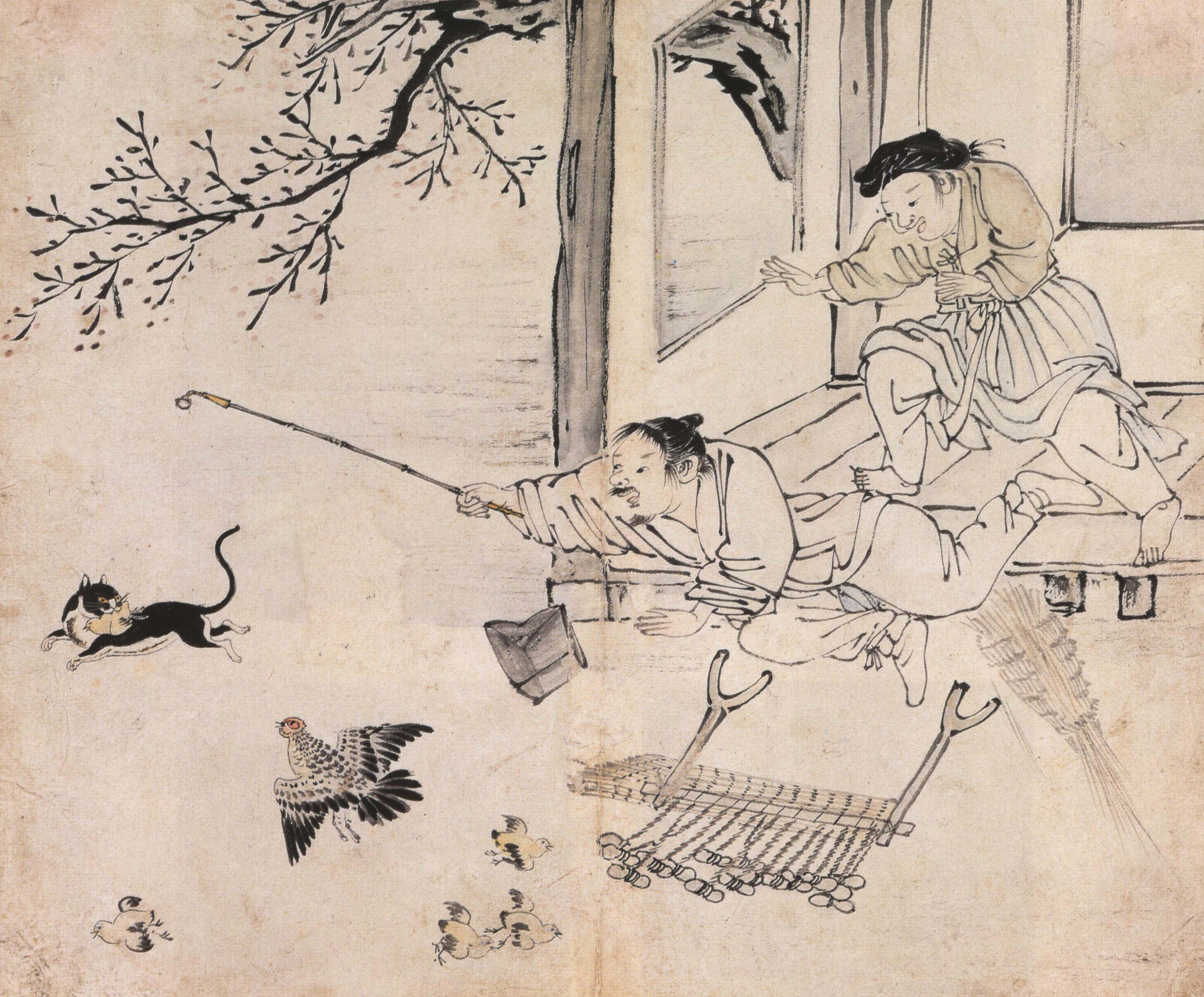
Pajeokdo (파적도, 破寂圖), literally "breaking serenity", Kansong Art Museum

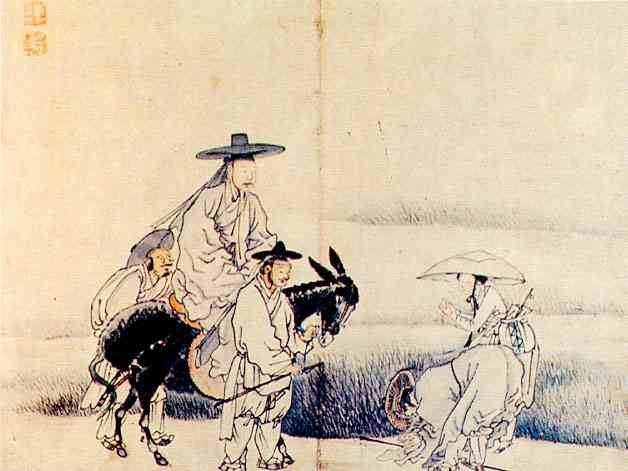
Bansangdo (반상도, 班常圖), literally yangban and commoners

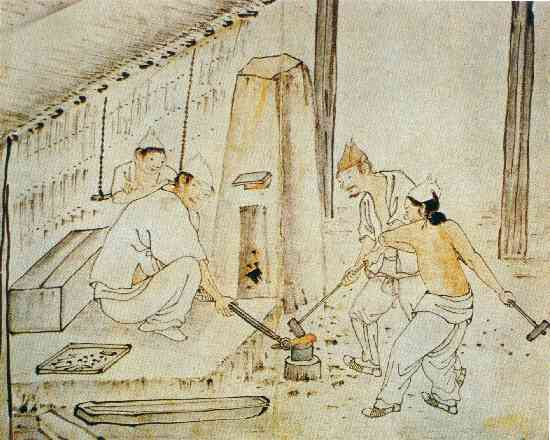
A smithy (대장간)

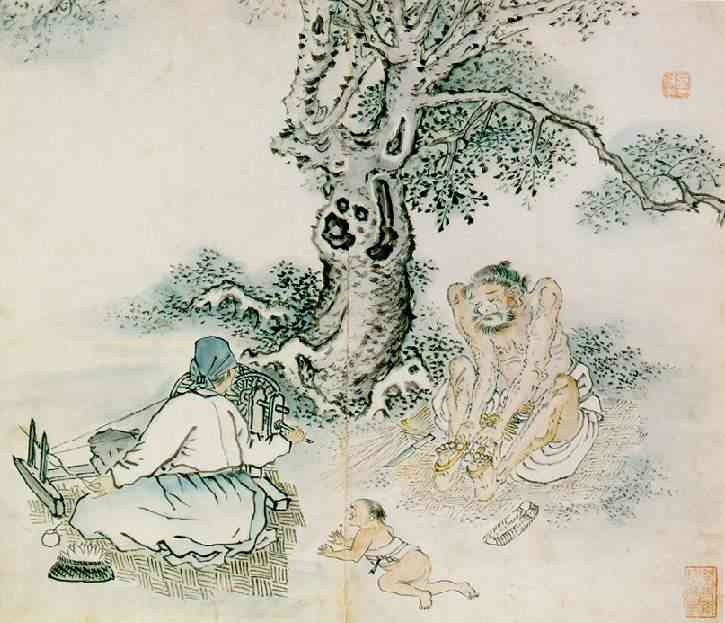
A family under the tree (수하일가도, 樹下一家圖)

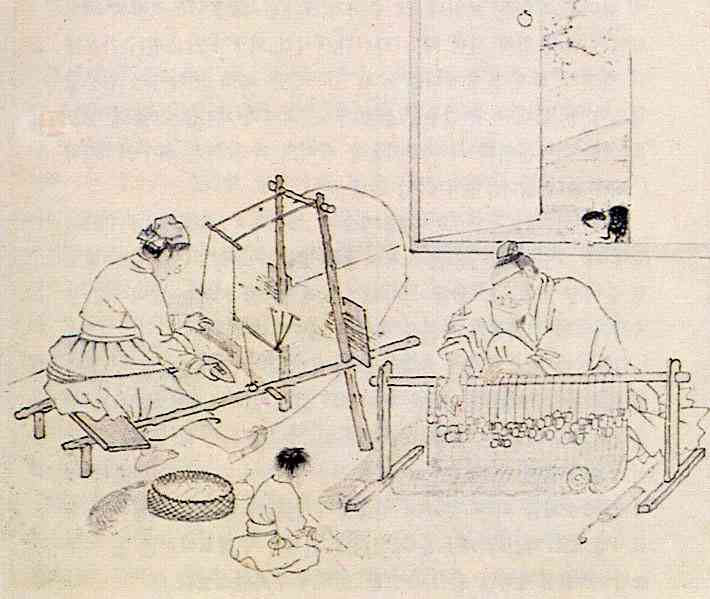
Weaving a straw mat (자리짜기)

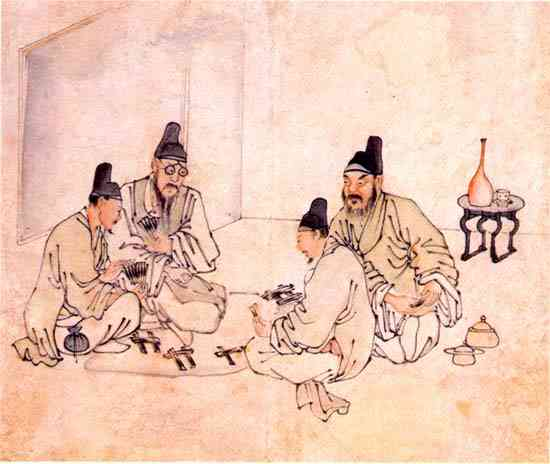
Gambling (투전도, 鬪錢圖)

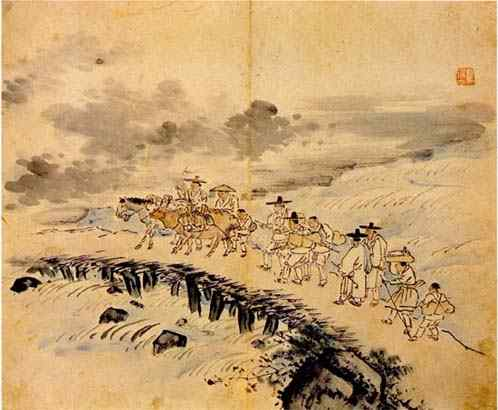
Returning from a market (귀시도, 歸市圖)

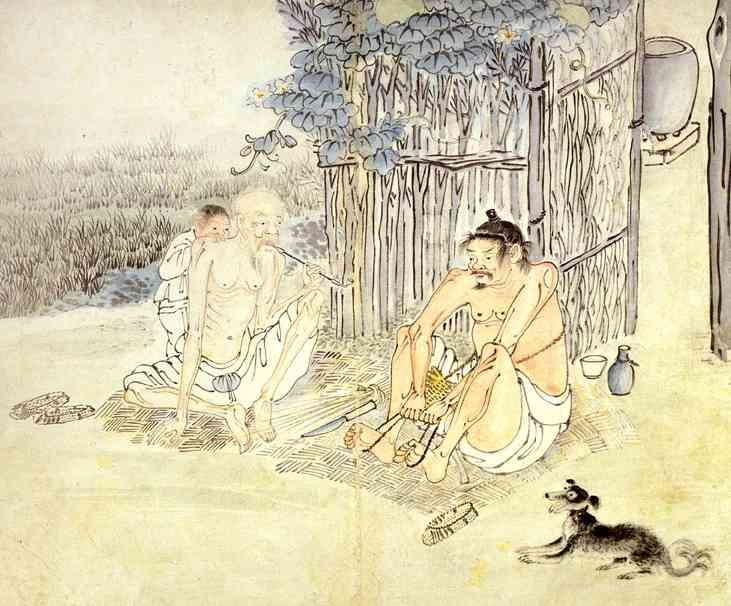
Weaving a mat in the sweltering summer", (성하직구, 盛夏織구)

== See also ==
- Korean painting
- List of Korean painters
