= Yi Inmun =

Korean painter (1745–1821)

- Hangul: 이인문
- Hanja: 李寅文
- RR: I Inmun
- MR: I Inmun

Art name
- Hangul: 유춘; 고송류수관도인
- Hanja: 有春; 古松流水館道人
- RR: Yuchun; Gosongryusugwandoin
- MR: Yuch'un; Kosongnyusugwandoin

Courtesy name
- Hangul: 문욱
- Hanja: 文郁
- RR: Munuk
- MR: Munuk

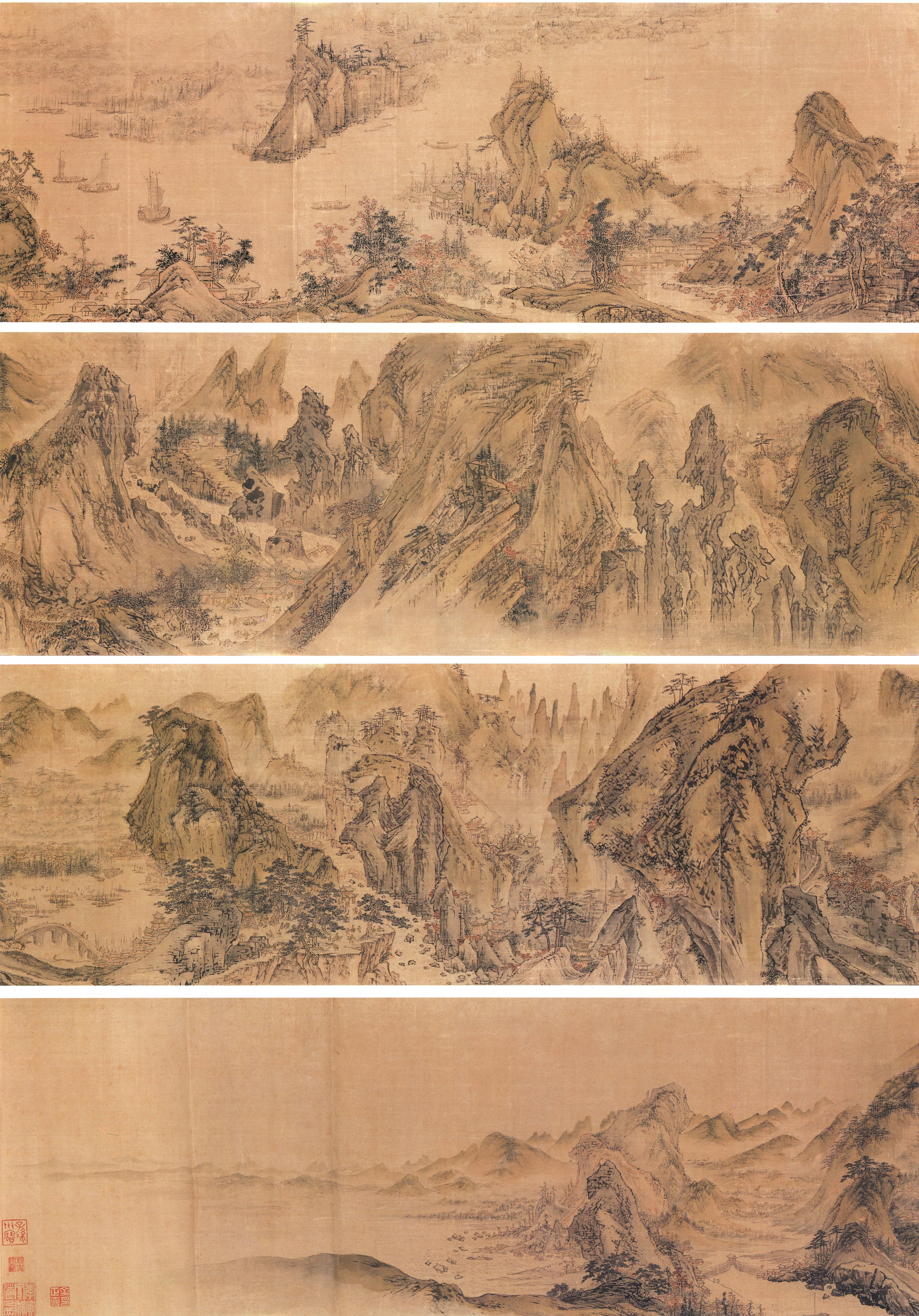
Streams and Mountains Without End by Yi Inmun

Yi Inmun (Korean: 이인문; Hanja: 李寅文; 1745–1821), also known as Yuch'un, was a court painter of the late Joseon Dynasty, primarily of landscapes. He also held a military position in the court. Perhaps his best-known work is a silk scroll entitled Gangsan mujindo (강산무진도; 江山無盡圖; lit. Streams and Mountains Without End), which is displayed in the National Museum of Korea in Seoul.

In 1968, the American composer Alan Hovhaness (who had visited South Korea in 1963) composed a chamber symphony inspired by Yi's painting, entitled Mountains and Rivers Without End.

== See also ==
- Korean painting
- List of Korean painters
- Korean art
- Korean culture
