= Chŏng Hongnae =

Korean painter (fl. 18th century)

- Hangul: 정홍래
- Hanja: 鄭弘來
- RR: Jeong Hongrae
- MR: Chŏng Hongnae

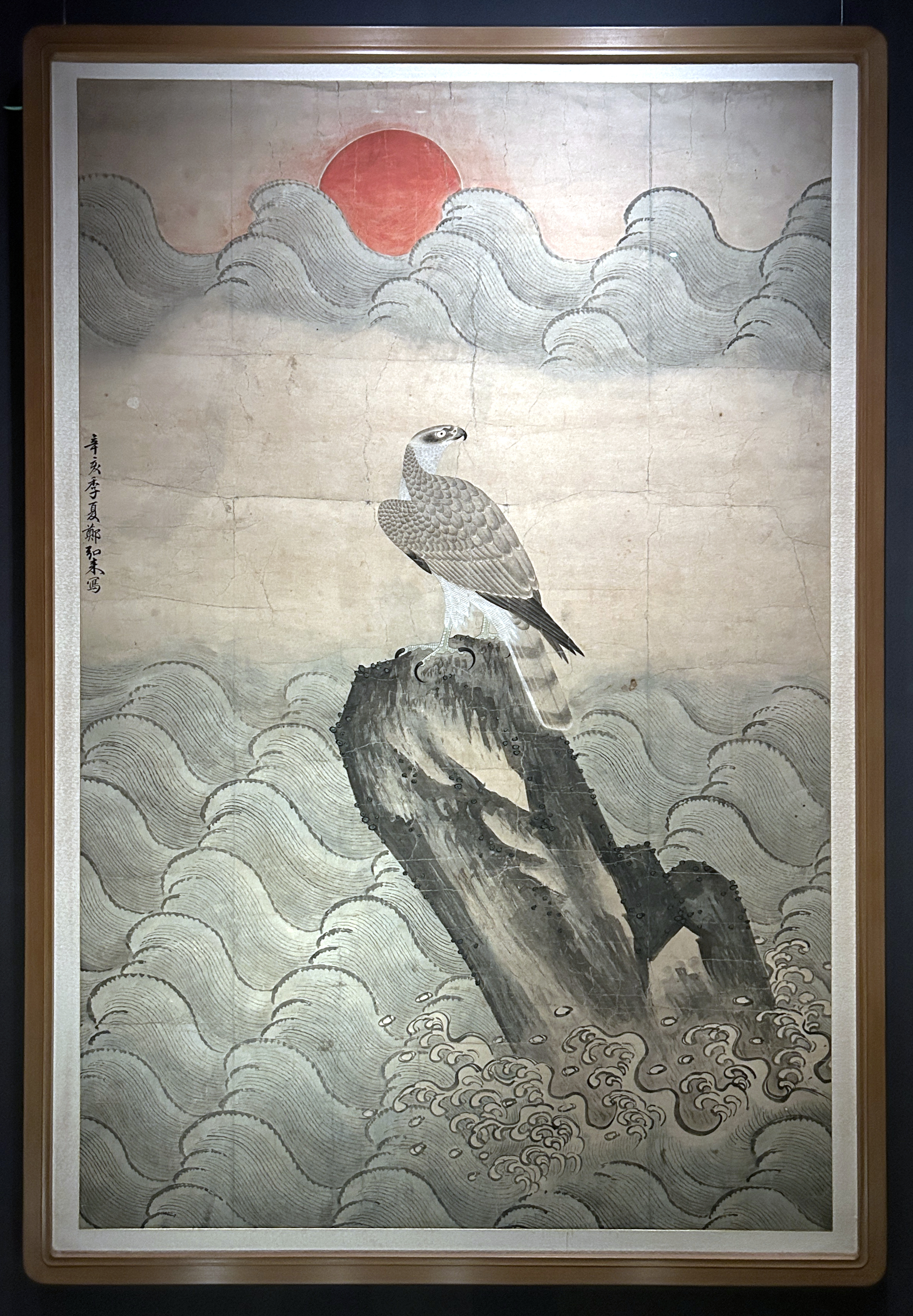
'A Hawk Before the Sunrise' painted on silk. Collection of the National Museum of Korea.

Chŏng Hongnae (Korean: 정홍래; Hanja: 鄭弘來; 1720 – ?) also known as Jeong Hong-rae, was an 18th-century Korean court painter who worked within the Tohwasŏ (Royal Bureau of Painting). He often painted scenes from nature, particularly birds of prey. He was also referred to by the nicknames Manhyang (만향; 晩香) and Kugo (국오; 菊塢).

== Depicting birds of prey ==
One of his renowned paintings is Ugirhoch'wido (욱일호취도; 旭日豪鷲圖; lit. 'Heroic Condor at Dawn'), which is in the collection of the National Museum of Korea.

One of his several depictions of a hawk at dawn is in the collection of the Metropolitan Museum of Art in New York.

From the early Joseon period, birds of prey were associated with a branch of government known as the Imperial Censorate, suggesting the qualities of courage and a keen sense of justice. During the late Joseon period, works depicting majestic wild falcons in nature began to appear, rather than captive birds restrained by ropes.

According to Dr. Shim Hyeong-cheol, a professor of Korean Language Education, a brave male hawk is called xióngyīng (雄鷹), and if the Chinese pronunciation of xióngyīng is read backwards, it becomes yīngxióng (英雄). In other words, a picture of a male hawk symbolizes a hero.

== Royal portraits ==
Chŏng also participated in reproducing portraits of royalty, such as King Sukjong (1674–1720), and high officials in government. Some elements of his technique have been compared to those of an earlier painter, Chŏng Sŏn.

For the portrait of King Sukjong, he worked with the painters Chang Tŭngman (1684-1764) and Chang Kyŏngju (1710-?).

== Other notable works ==
Also at the National Museum is "Climbing Pine Trees and Observing the Water". Another notable work is "Sangunpohyodo", which is at the Kansong Art Museum in Seoul.

== Service as a scholar-official ==
It is not known when he became a painter at the Tohwasŏ, but he served as a 6th-rank chubu (注簿), a Naesigyo (內侍敎授), and a Chungnim ch'albang (重林察訪).
