= Mahayonsa =

Buddhist temple in North Korea

Coordinates: 38.6403°N 128.0854°E

Mahayonsa (Korean: 마하연사; Hanja: 摩訶衍寺) was a Korean Buddhist temple located at Naegeumgang-ri, Kumgang-gun, Kangwon-do, North Korea. This structure was located at an altitude of 846m, the highest point of the Manpok-dong Valley of Mount Geumgang and was a branch hermitage of the Yujomsa temple.

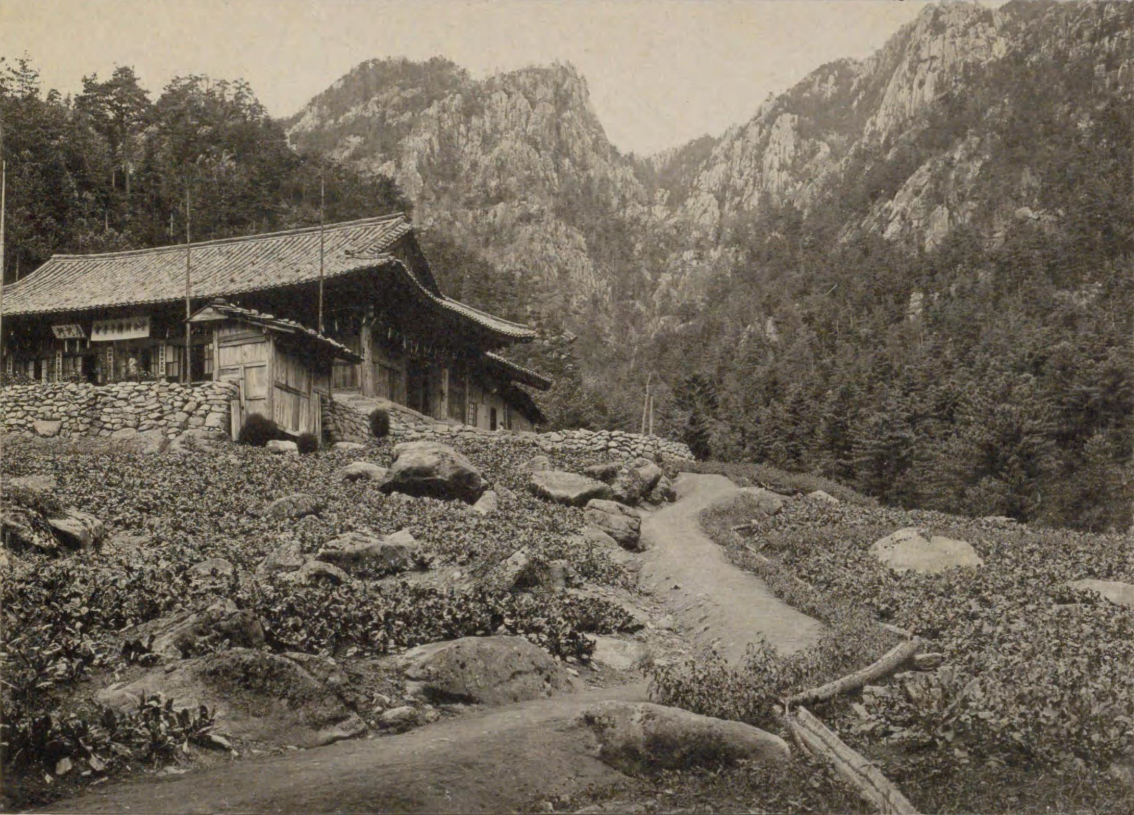

== Paintings (Joseon period) ==
Mahayeon was depicted by several Korean painters. Among them:

- Kim Hong-do <마하연 (摩訶衍)> as #43 in the 《Geumgang Four Counties Album 금강사군첩(金剛四郡帖)》, 1788
- Kim Ha-jong, <마하연 (摩訶衍)> as #17 of the 《Haesando Album》, 1815

== Japanese colonial period ==
The #12 (1932) of the "Joseon historical site walk" contains several views of each temple around Mt. Geumgang, Mahayeon among them. Moreover, the area became a touristic destination, leading to the publication of illustrated guides. These pictures taken during the Japanese colonial period are precious since many of these buildings are no longer extant.

== Destruction ==
During the Korean war, the Bombing of North Korea dropped a total of 635,000 tons of bombs, including 32,557 tons of napalm, on Korea. "Every installation, facility, and village in North Korea [became] a military and tactical target", and the orders given to the Fifth Air Force and Bomber Command was to "destroy every means of communications and every installation, factory, city, and village". As a result, this hermitage has been destroyed by the US bombings of the area.

== Sources ==
- Sekino Tadashi (1916–1935). 朝鮮總督府, Japanese Governor of Korea (ed.). 朝鮮古蹟図譜 [Joseon historical sites walk]. 15 volumes.
- Tokuda Tomijirō (徳田富次郎) (1930). Mt. Kumgang of 12,000 peaks: Korea. Tokuda Photo Studio Main Store.
- Korean Buddhist Jogye Order Headquarters, ed. (2011). 북한의 전통사찰 A B 세트 [North Korean traditional temples]. 養士齋. ISBN 9788996665908.. 10 volumes, 2800 pages. What is said about Jeongyangsa can be accessed through this Naver link.
- Armstrong, Charles K. (2010-12-20). "The Destruction and Reconstruction of North Korea, 1950-1960" (PDF). The Asia-Pacific Journal. 8 (51): 1.
- Conway-Lanz, Sahr (4 August 2014). "The Ethics of Bombing Civilians After World War II: The Persistence of Norms Against Targeting Civilians in the Korean War". The Asia-Pacific Journal. 12 (37).
