= Jangansa =

Former Buddhist temple in North Korea

Coordinates: 38.6135°N 128.0671°E

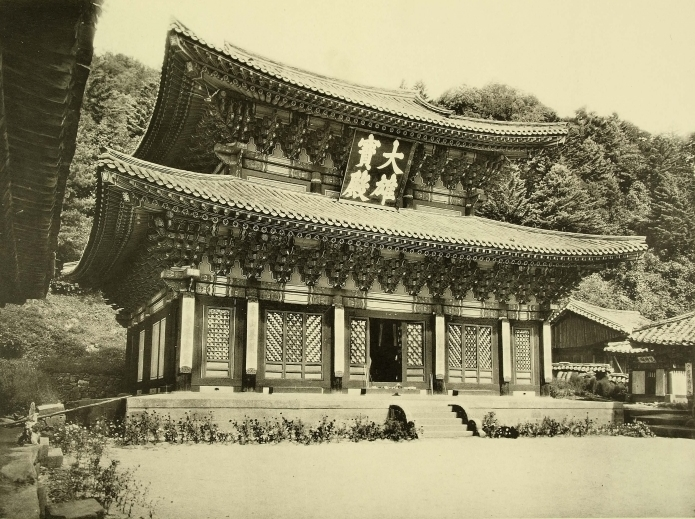
Main Hall 1932, from 朝鮮古蹟図譜

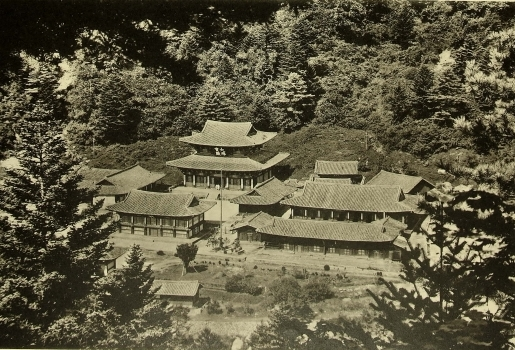
Jangansa Temple 1932, from 朝鮮古蹟図譜

Jangansa (Korean: 장안사; Hanja: 長安寺) was a Korean Buddhist temple on Mount Geumgang (금강산,金剛山). This temple was one of the Four Great Temples of Mount Geumgang, along with Pyohunsa (표훈사; 表訓寺), Singyesa (신계사, 神溪寺) and Yujomsa (유점사; 楡岾寺). This temple is said to have been founded by monk Hyeryang during the reign of Beopheung of Silla or during the reign of Yangwon of Goguryeo.

== Paintings (Joseon period) ==
Jangansa was depicted by many Korean painters. Among them:

- Jeong Seon in the 《Sin-myo Year Pungakdo Album 辛卯年楓岳圖帖 》, 1711, watercolor on silk, approximately 36×37.4 cm.
- Kim Hong-do in the 《Geumgang Four Counties Album 금강사군첩(金剛四郡帖)》, 1788
- Kim Ha-jong in the 《Haesando Album 해산도첩(海山圖帖)》, 1815

== Japanese colonial period ==
The volume 12 (1932) of the "Joseon historical site walk" contains several views of each temple around Mt. Geumgang, Jangansa among them. Taken during the Japanese colonial period by a well-known scholar, these pictures are precious since many of these buildings are no longer extant. Two of them are reproduced here.

== Destruction ==
During the Korean war, the Bombing of North Korea dropped a total of 635,000 tons of bombs, including 32,557 tons of napalm, on Korea. "Every installation, facility, and village in North Korea [became] a military and tactical target", and the orders given to the Fifth Air Force and Bomber Command was to "destroy every means of communications and every installation, factory, city, and village".

As a result, the whole site has been destroyed by the US bombings of the area. Unlike Singyesa, Jangansa was not rebuilt. The ruins are classified as the #96 National Treasure (North Korea).
