= Pyohunsa =

North Korea Temple

Coordinates: 38°37′49″N 128°4′4″E

- Hangul: 표훈사
- Hanja: 表訓寺
- RR: Pyohunsa
- MR: P'yohunsa

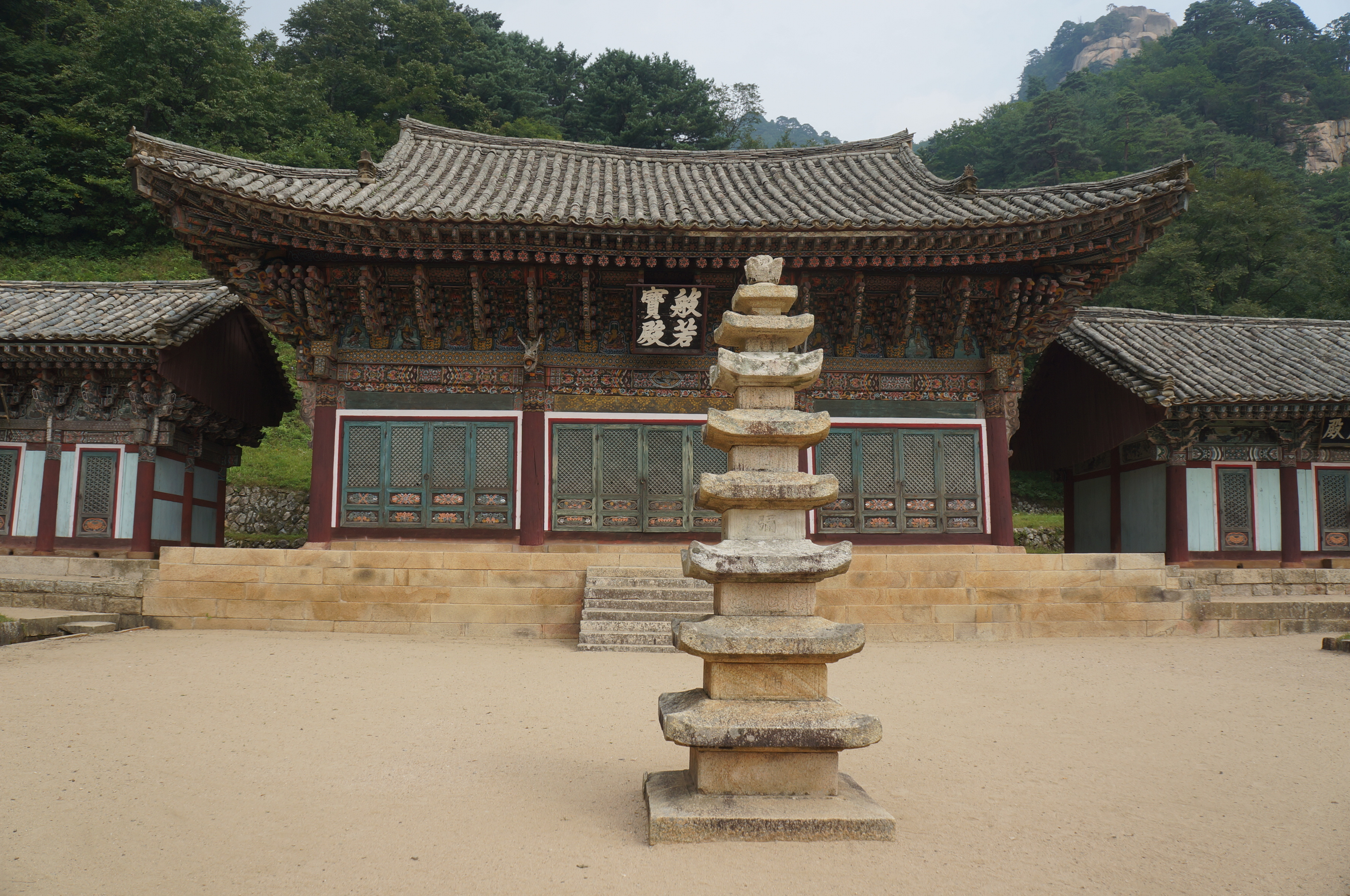
Pyohunsa Buddhist Temple, a National Treasure of North Korea

P'yohun-sa (Korean: 표훈사; Hanja: 表訓寺) is a Korean Buddhist temple located on Mount Kumgang, North Korea. Founded in the 7th century under the kingdom of Silla, it is the only one of Mount Kumgang's four great temples to have survived the Korean War. It is listed as the #97 National Treasures of North Korea.

== History ==
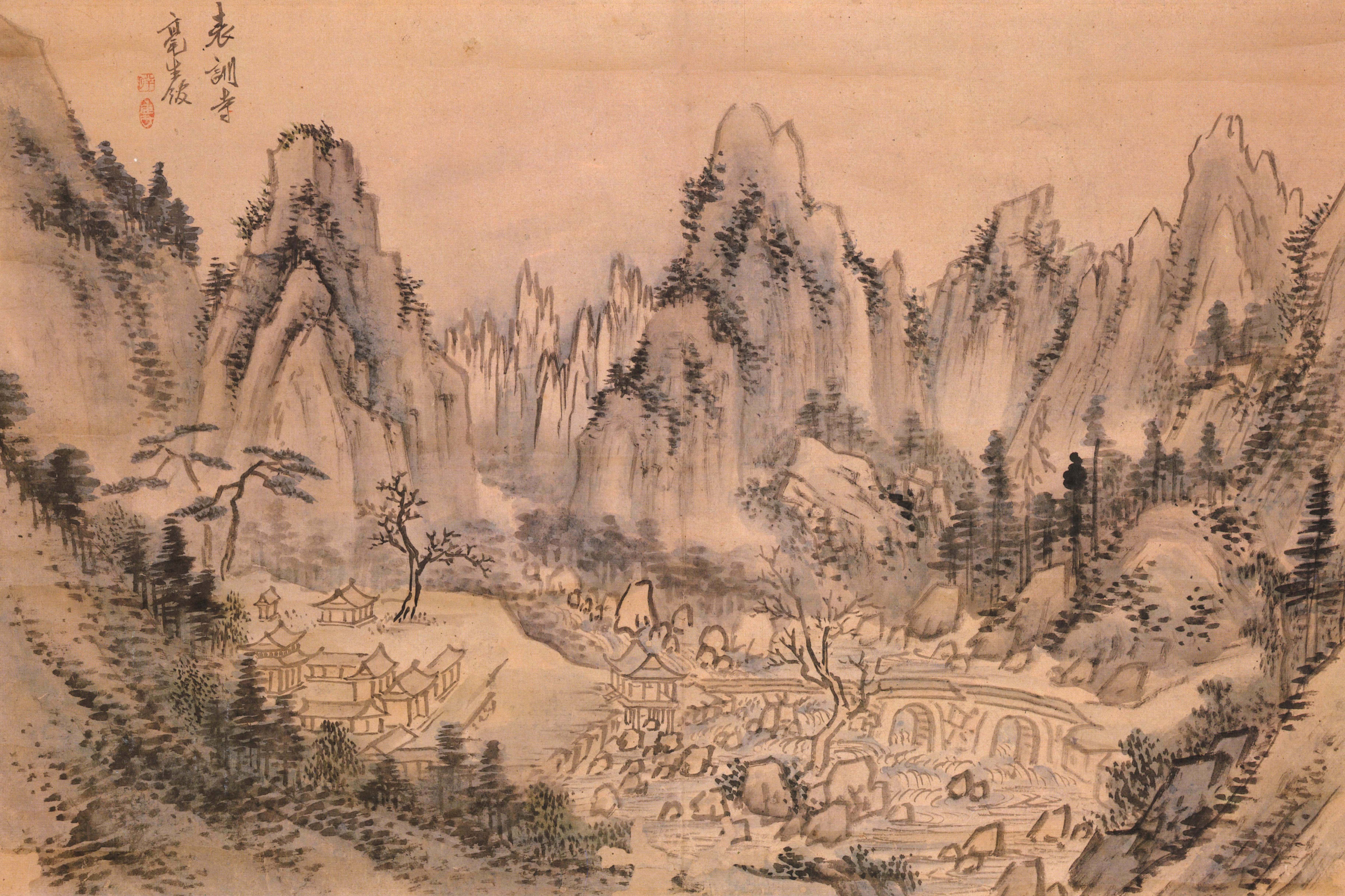
The temple as seen by Ch'oe Puk

Pyohunsa was founded in 670 under the fervently Buddhist kingdom of Silla, who viewed the Kumgang mountains as sacred. Enlarged over the years, it underwent many successive restoration, including one in 1778. Eventually it became known as one of the Four Great Temples of Mount Kumgang, along with Changansa, Singyesa and Yujomsa. Pilgrims were soon flocking to the temple, and eventually, it financed the construction of the smaller Chongyang Temple further up the mountain to accommodate the excess.

During the Japanese colonial period, Mount Kumgang became a major tourist site, and the temple (known by its Japanese pronunciation as Hyōkun-ji) received many visitors to admire its beautiful setting and architecture. Because of this, it underwent significant restoration work funded by the Japanese administration.

Pyohunsa was the only one of the four great temples of Mount Kumgang to survive the Korean War. The others were completely destroyed by US bombings of the area, though Singyesa has since been rebuilt. Today, it is still a major point of interest for any visitor to Mount Kumgang.

In the temple's cemetery stands the Stupa of the Venerable Sosan, a Buddhist hermit who organized bands of monks to fight back the invading armies of Japanese warlord Toyotomi Hideyoshi during the Imjin Wars. The stupa is listed as Cultural asset #306.

== Structure ==
Several of the 20 original halls are no longer extant. Among the remaining ones, are:

Banyabojeon, 반야보전 (般若寶殿), the Main Hall,
Myeobujeon, 명부전,
Yeongsanjeon, 영산전,
Seven Stars Pavilion, 칠성각,
Eosil Pavilion, 어실각 (御室閣),
Neungparu, 능파루 (凌波樓),
Pandobang, 판도방 (判道房)

== Joseon period paintings ==
Pyohunsa was depicted by several Korean painters. Among them:

- Jeong Seon as a part of
  〈Geumgangnaesanchongdo 金剛內山總圖〉 in the 《1711 Pungakdo Album, 신묘년풍악도첩, 辛卯年楓岳圖帖》
  〈Pungaknaesan chongramdo〉 (1740s)
- Ch'oe Puk, fl 1755-85
- Kim Hong-do <표훈사 (表訓寺)> as #43 in the 《Geumgang Four Counties Album 금강사군첩(金剛四郡帖)》, 1788

== See also ==
- National Treasures of North Korea
- Korean Buddhism
- Korean architecture
