= Jang Young-chul (disambiguation) =

Jang Young-chul is a South Korean television screenwriter.

Jang Young-chul or Jang Yeong-cheol may also refer to:

- Jang Young-chul (politician) (1936–2023), South Korean politician
- Jang Yeong-cheol (born 1964), South Korean sprint canoer
