= Chang Tŭngman =

Korean painter (1684–1764)

- Born: 1684
- Died: 1764 (aged 79–80)
- Notable work: Portraits of King Sukjong, King Sejo and King Yeongjo

Korean name
- Hangul: 장득만
- Hanja: 張得萬
- RR: Jang Deukman
- MR: Chang Tŭngman

Chang Tŭngman (Korean: 장득만; 1684–1764), also known as Jang Deuk-man, was an 18th-century Korean court painter who worked within the Tohwasŏ (Royal Bureau of Painting).

Chang was a member of the Indong Chang clan, which is associated with painting as a profession. He was the father of court painter Chang Kyŏngju.

== Notable works ==
Chang's works included portraits of King Sukjong in 1713, King Sejo (1417–1468; reigned 1455–1468) in 1735 and King Yeongjo in 1748.

Along with several other artists, his work is included in an album of Narrative Figure Paintings which depicts ancient Chinese tales at the National Museum of Korea. He worked collaboratively with other painters on the ink and colour on silk painting King's Visit to Yeongsugak Pavilion, which is also in the museum.

In 2000, a 20th-century copy of one of his paintings was stolen and taken to Japan, then later recovered and returned to its owners in 2018.
