= Podok Hermitage =

North Korea Mountain

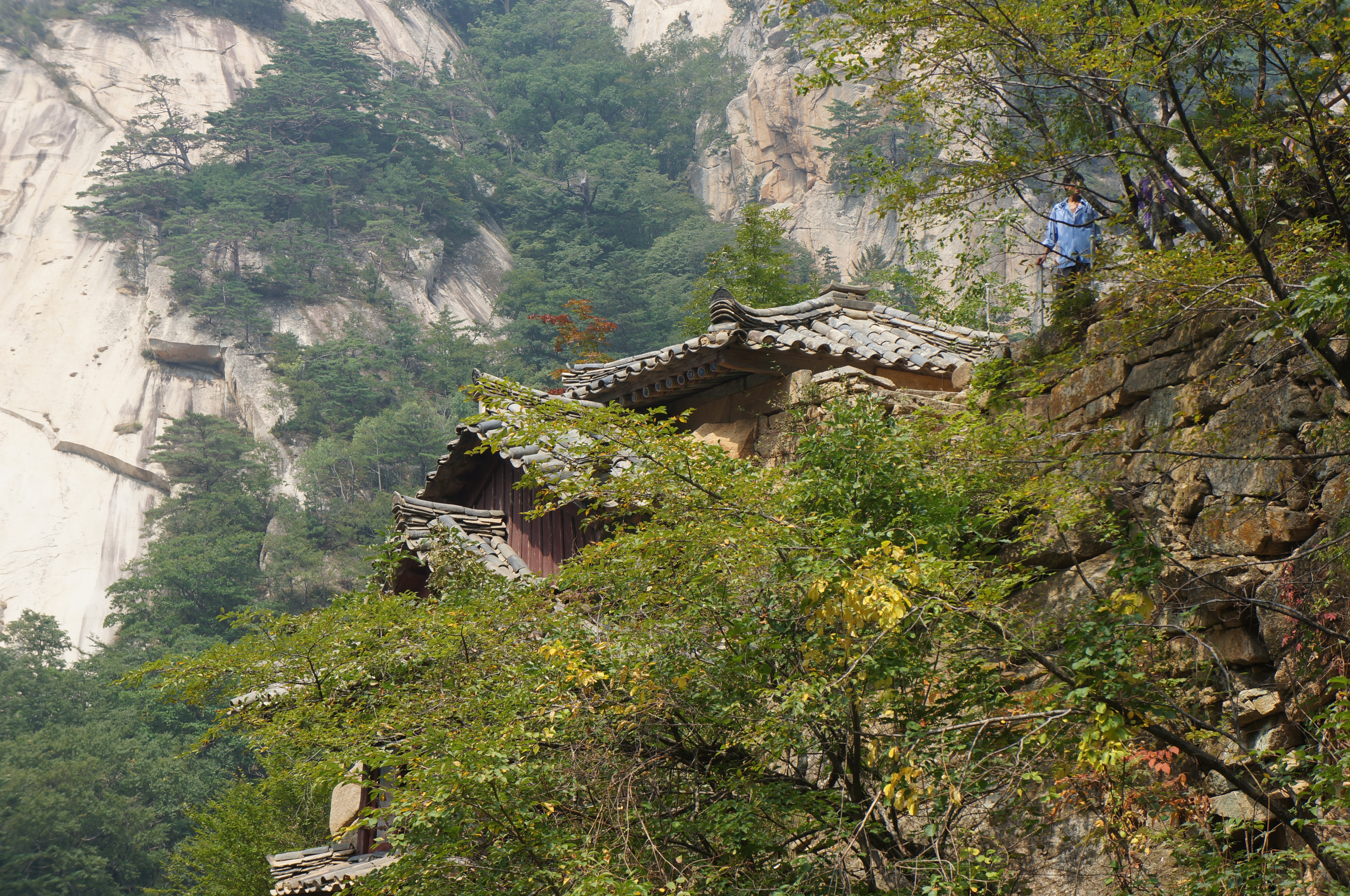

Korean name
- Hangul: 보덕암
- Hanja: 普德庵
- RR: Bodeogam
- MR: Podŏgam

The Podok Hermitage is a mountain hermitage in Naegang-ri, Kumgang-gun, North Korea. First built during the Koguryo period, it was rebuilt in 1675. The one room building is supported by a single copper pole. The structure is in the middle of a 20-metre-high cliff, leaning against the rock in front of the Podok Grotto.

Since the hermitage's construction in 627, solitary Buddhist monks lived in the structure, looking down at the valley through a hole in the floor.

== Paintings ==
This hermitage was depicted by many Korean painters. Among them:

- Kim Hongdo, <Black Dragon Pond below Bodeok Hermitage 흑룡담망보덕암(黑龍潭望普德庵)> in 《금강사군첩(金剛四郡帖)》
- Kim Ha-jong, <보덕암(普德庵)> as #14 of the 《Haesando Album 해산도첩(海山圖帖)》, 1815

== See also ==
- National Treasures of North Korea
