= Chang Kyŏngju =

Korean painter (fl. 18th century)

- Hangul: 장경주
- Hanja: 張敬周
- RR: Jang Gyeongju
- MR: Chang Kyŏngju

Chang Kyŏngju (Korean: 장경주; Hanja: 張敬周; 1710 – ?) also known as Jang Gyeong-ju, was an 18th-century Korean court painter who worked within the Tohwasŏ (Royal Bureau of Painting), and served as the magistrate of Sacheon County. His pen name was Yebo (禮甫), and he was part of the Indong Jang clan, a family of painters.

Chang supervised projects for royal events and was known for his skills in portrait painting. In 1744, he collaborated with other artists in an official portrait of King Yeongjo. He was also commissioned by King Yeongjo to paint two portraits of King Sukjong, with one of these enshrined in Yeonghuijeon Hall and the other in Seonwonjeon Hall at Gyeongbokgung Palace. He was the third generation of the Chang family to take part in this ongoing official project.

Chang was the son of Chang Tŭngman (1684–1764) and an ancestor of Chang Hanjong. He was a colleague of the painter Chŏng Hongnae.

He achieved the title of second-ranked civil official, which was equal to a minister.

== Notable works ==
Together with a team of fellow court painters, he painted the portrait “Commemorative Album for King Yeongjo’s Entry into the Giroso Club of Senior Officials” (1744–1745). Other painters who worked on this portrait included his father Chang Tŭngman.

In 1744 he painted a portrait of Yun Jeung with the inscription '崇禎紀元後再甲子四月摹' (Copy in April of the Jiazi year after the Chongzhen era), which has been designated as a national treasure.

In 1746 he painted a half-length portrait of Ku T'aekkyu (1693–1754, 具宅奎), who was a scholar-official who was prominent during King Yeongjo's reign.

A posthumous work is the Kisa Kyŏnghoech'ŏp, which is in the collection of the National Museum of Korea. The work was produced in 1745 to commemorate eight ministers who entered Kisa service in 1744. These included his father Tŭngman, Chŏng Hongnae and Cho Ch'anghŭi.
