= Yujomsa =

Buddhist temple in North Korea

Coordinates: 38°35′5″N 128°9′58″E

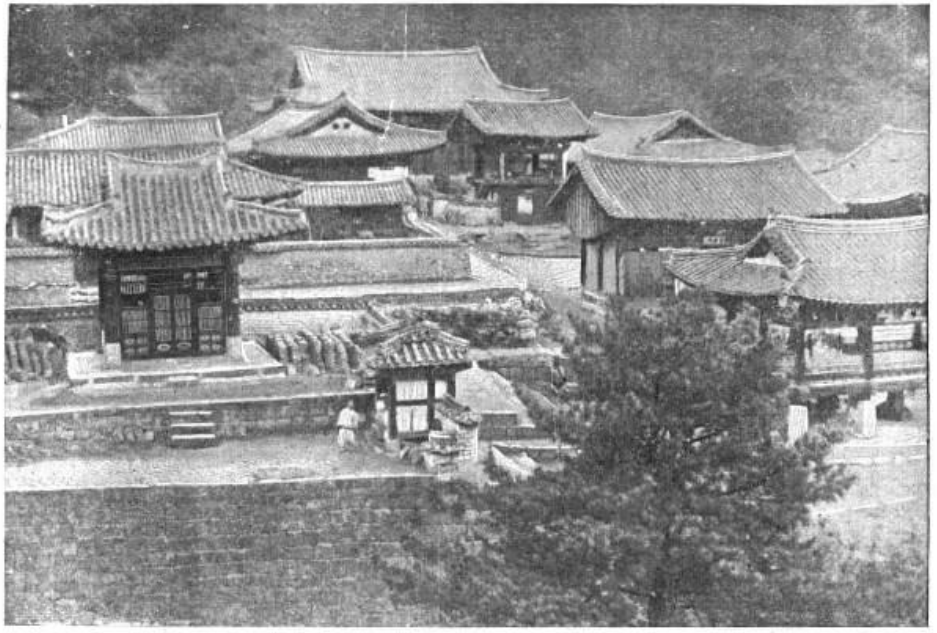
- Yujomsa Temple in the 1900s

Korean name
- Hangul: 유점사
- Hanja: 楡岾寺
- RR: Yujeomsa
- MR: Yujŏmsa

Yujŏmsa was a Korean Buddhist temple located on Mount Kumgang, North Korea. Founded under the kingdom of Silla, it underwent many successive restorations before being destroyed by American forces during the Korean War.

== History ==
Yujom Temple was founded in the 6th century under the fervently Buddhist kingdom of Silla. It underwent a major enlargement in 1168 under Emperor Uijong of Koryo, and again in the 15th century. Eventually becoming a major site of pilgrimage and, along with Changansa, Pyohunsa, and Singyesa, was known as one of its Four Great Temples of Mt. Kumgang. It was the largest and the oldest of the four, and at its height it encompassed over 40 buildings. Between 1883 and 1885, it underwent its final enlargement, though it still retained many of its original Silla-era characteristics.

During the Japanese administration of Korea, Mount Kumgang became a major tourist site, and the temple (known by its Japanese pronunciation as Yusen-ji) received many visitors to admire its beautiful setting and architecture. Because of this, it underwent significant restoration work funded by this Japanese government during this time.

Despite its historical significance, the temple was bombed by US forces during the Korean War. Due to this, nothing remains today of this temple besides its foundation stones.

== See also ==
- Four Great Temples of Mt. Kumgang
- National Treasures of North Korea
- Korean Buddhism
- Korean architecture
