= Jeongyangsa =

Jeongyangsa, also romanized Chŏngyang-sa, (정양사, 正陽寺, N 38.6321, E 128.0628) was a Korean Buddhist temple on Mount Geumgang (금강산,金剛山). This temple was known as the best scenic spot in the Mount Geumgang area. Located at an altitude of 848m, it overlooks the Pyohunsa temple, located 1 km eastwards and 200m below, on the banks of the Donggeumgang River.

There were several buildings such as Banyajeon (般若殿, enshrining the Beopgi Bodhisattva as the main Buddha), Yakjeon (藥師殿, an hexagonal hall), Heolseongru (헐성루, 歇惺樓, a small pavilion on the right side of the temple grounds, to see the 12000 peaks of the mountain), Yeongsanjeon, and Nahanjeon, as well as a three-story pagoda and stone lanterns.

The #12 (1932) of the "Joseon historical site walk" contains several views of each temple around Mt. Geumgang, Jeongyangsa among them. These pictures taken during the Japanese colonial period are precious since many of these buildings are no longer extant.

During the Korean war, the Bombing of North Korea dropped a total of 635,000 tons of bombs, including 32,557 tons of napalm, on Korea. "Every installation, facility, and village in North Korea [became] a military and tactical target", and the orders given to the Fifth Air Force and Bomber Command was to "destroy every means of communications and every installation, factory, city, and village". As a result, Heolseongru, Yeongsanjeon, Myeongbujeon, Seungbang and Nahanjeon have been destroyed by the US bombings of the area. The other buildings were damaged, but were restored afterwards and classified as the #99 National Treasure (North Korea).

== Paintings ==
Jeongyangsa was depicted by many Korean painters. Among them:

- Jeong Seon, <Jeongyangsado>, 18th century, pale color on paper, 22.1 x 61.0 cm
- Kim Ha-jong, <Jeongyang Temple below Cheonildae Rocks, 천일대망정양사, 天一臺望正陽寺> as #09 of the Haesando Album, 1815
- Kim Ha-jong also released a <Frontal View of Mt. Geumgang from Hyeolseongru Pavilion, 헐성루망전면전경, 歇性樓望前面全景> as #10 of the same Album, 1815
