= Kim Hajong =

Joseon painter (1793 – after 1875)

Kim Hajong (Korean: 김하종; Hanja: 金夏鐘; 1793 – after 1875) was a Joseon court painter. His art name was Yudang (유당; 蕤堂). He is known for the Album of Sea and Mountains (Haesan-docheop, 해산도첩,海山圖帖), which contains 25 paintings, each of them is 29.7×43.3 cm. This work was painted in 1815, at the request of Yi Gwangmun (1778–1838), who wrote the colophon of the Album.

== Contents of the Haesando Album ==
Remark: the hanja given here are an exact reproduction of the title written on each painting

Paintings 1-2-3-4-25 are about Mount Seorak while paintings 5--24 are about Mount Geumgang

1. Naksan Temple, 낙산사, 洛山寺 (38.1246,128.6283, near Sokcho)
2. Gyejo Grotto, 계조굴, 繼祖窟
3. Seorakssang Falls, 설악쌍폭, 雪嶽雙瀑
4. Seorak Gyeongcheon Wall, 설악경천벽, 雪嶽擎天壁
5. Jangan Temple seen from Cheonildae Rocks, 장안사, 長安寺
6. Myeonggyeong Rocks, 명경대, 明鏡臺
7. Dabo Peak, 다보탑, 多寶塔
8. Yeongwon Valley, 영원동, 靈源洞
9. Jeongyang Temple below Cheonildae Rocks, 천일대망정양사, 天一臺望正陽寺
10. Frontal View of Mount Geumgang from Hyeolseongru Pavilion (at Jeongyangsa), 헐성루망전면전경, 歇性樓望前面全景
11. Sumi Peaks, 수미탑, 須彌塔
12. Gugu Hermitage, 구구동, 九九洞
13. Bunseol Pond, 분설담, 噴雪潭
14. Bodeok Hermitage, 보덕암, 普德菴
15. Jinju Pearl Pond, 진주담, 眞珠潭
16. Gaseop Valley, 가섭동, 迦葉洞
17. Mahayon Hermitage, 마하연, 摩訶衍
18. Twelve Falls seen from Eunseondae Rocks, 은선대망십이폭, 隱仙臺望十二暴
19. Flying Phoenix Falls, 비봉폭, 飛鳳暴
20. Nine Dragons Falls, 구룡폭, 九龍瀑
21. Chongseok Rocks, 叢石, 총석정
22. Chongseok Rock seen from Hwansonjong Site, 환선구지망총석, 喚仙舊址望叢石
23. Samil Lake, 삼일호, 三日湖
24. Coastal Geumgang, 해금강, 海金剛
25. Seorak's view, 설악전경, 雪嶽全景
