= Sin Yunbok =

Korean painter (1758–1813)

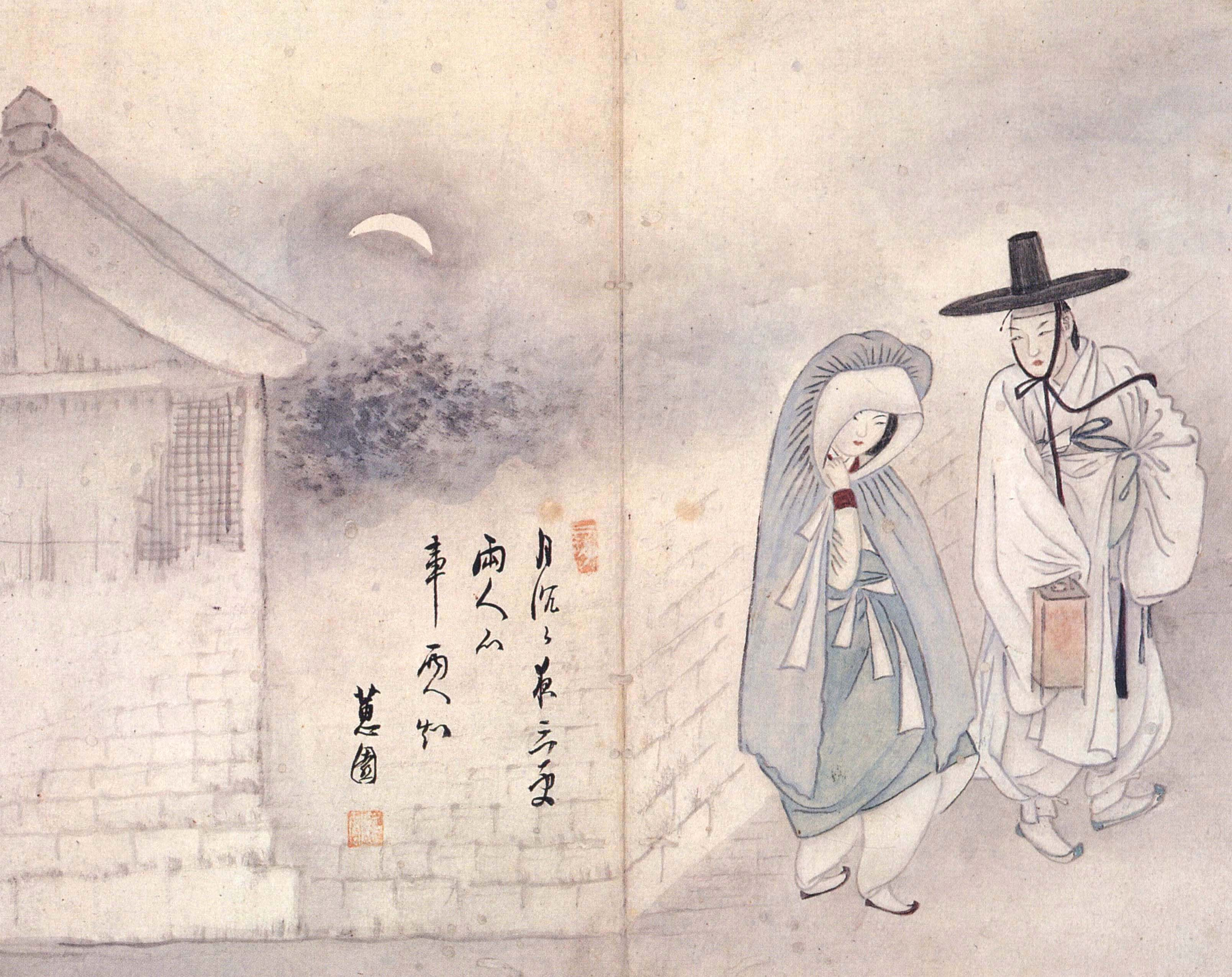

Korean name
- Hangul: 신윤복
- Hanja: 申潤福
- RR: Sin Yunbok
- MR: Sin Yunbok

Art name
- Hangul: 혜원
- Hanja: 蕙園
- RR: Hyewon
- MR: Hyewŏn

Courtesy name
- Hangul: 입부
- Hanja: 笠父
- RR: Ipbu
- MR: Ippu

Sin Yunbok (Korean: 신윤복; 1758–1813), better known by his art name Hyewŏn, was a Korean painter of the Joseon period. Like his contemporaries Kim Hongdo and Kim Tŭksin, he is known for his realistic depictions of daily life in his time. His genre paintings are distinctly more erotic than Kim Hongdo's, a fact which contributed to his expulsion from the royal painting institute, Tohwasŏ. Painting was frequently a hereditary occupation in the Joseon period, and Sin's father and grandfather had both been court painters. Together with Kim Hongdo and the later painter Chang Sŭngŏp, Sin is remembered today as one of the "Three Wons" of Joseon-period painting, referring to the shared particles in their art names.

== Biography ==
Not much is known about Sin Yunbok's life. He was the son of royal court painter Hanpyeong (한평; 漢枰), who had participated in painting the royal portraits of Yeongjo and Jeongjo. Sin reached the official rank of cheomjeoljesa (첨절제사; 僉節制使) at the Tohwasŏ and was adept at different styles of painting; genre, landscape, and animals. It is speculated that he left a great number of paintings due to the popularity of genre paintings during that era.

There are different studies and theories regarding his life, that he may not have ever been a member of the Tohwasŏ nor was he on close terms with Kim Hong-do.

== Style and legacy ==
Sin Yunbok, despite being greatly influenced and overshadowed by Kim Hongdo during his career, developed his own unique technique and artistry. Along with Kim Hongdo, he is known foremost for his genre paintings of the Joseon era. Whereas Kim depicted everyday life of peasants with a humorous touch, Sin showed glimpses of eroticism in his paintings of townspeople and kisaeng. His choice of characters, composition, and painting method differed from Kim's, with use of bright colors and delicate paint strokes. He also painted scenes of shamanism and townlife, offering insight to lifestyle and costumes of the late Joseon era.

His ink landscape paintings used clear light strokes in a method similar to that of Yun Chehong (윤제홍), the pioneer in new style painting of the late Joseon era. He is also known to not have used the traditional method of leaving empty space in his paintings, usually filling the whole canvas. Although he placed short verse and his seal on most of his paintings, none indicate the date nor time of their creation and it is difficult to define the progression of his painting style. As one of the pillars of genre painting in the Joseon era, he influenced many other painters afterwards.

His album, Hyewon Pungsokhwacheop, contains 30 of his paintings and was designated the 135th National Treasure of South Korea in 1970.

=== Famous paintings ===
- Portrait of a Beauty (미인도; 美人圖): Painting on silk. Depicts the standard of traditional beauty in the Joseon era. Realistic details of the hanbok are notable.
- Dano day (단오풍정; 端午風情): Painting on paper. Depicts a scene on Dano day; semi-nudes bathing in the stream, a woman in a bright red hanbok rides a swing, two young monks peek in the background.

== Gallery ==
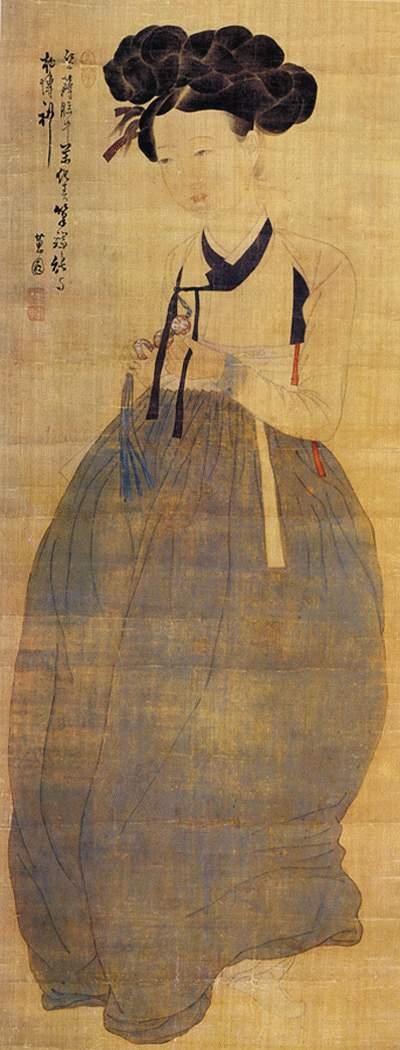
Portrait of a Beauty
(미인도; 美人圖)

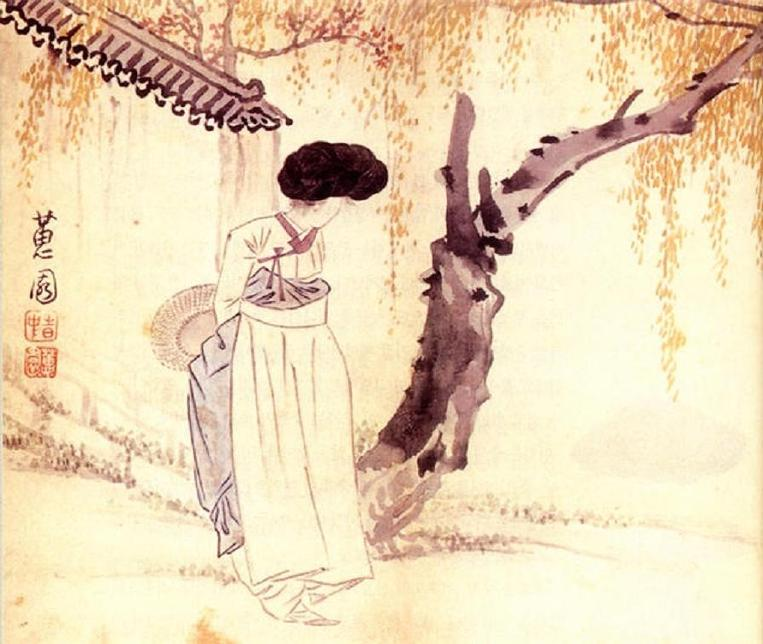
Waiting
(기다림)

Six paintings from the Yeosokdo Album (여속도첩):

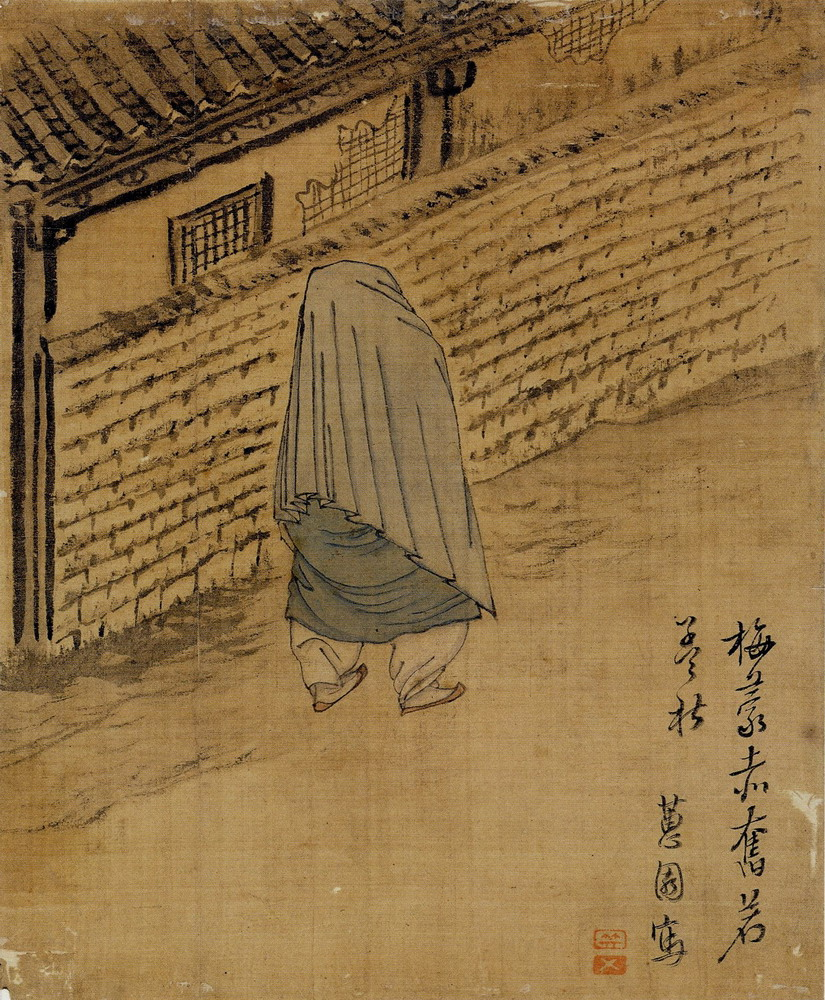
Woman with a cap
(처네를쓴 여인)

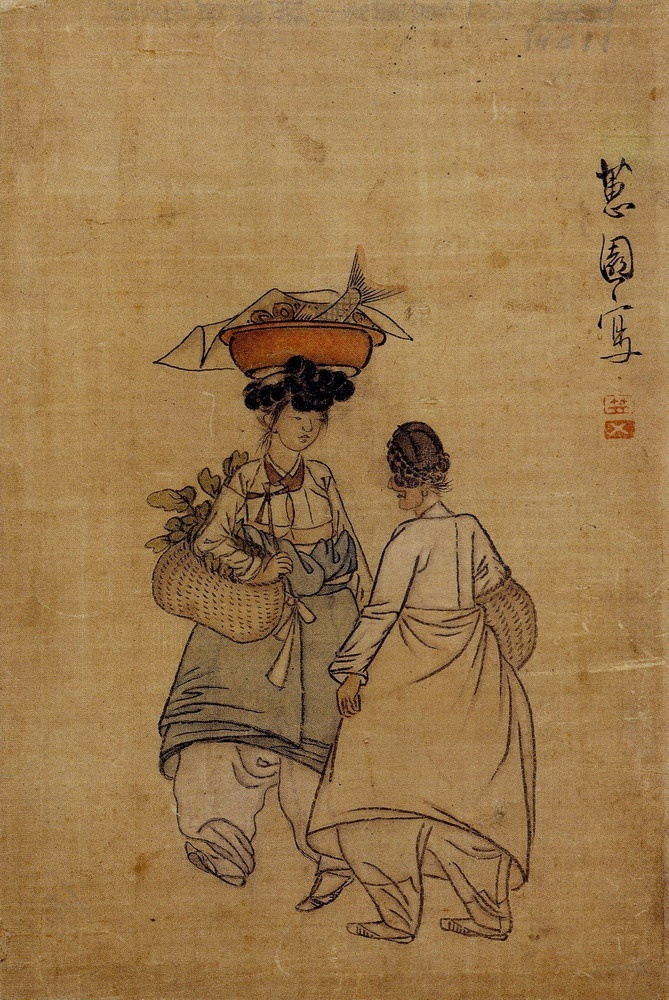
Women at fish market
(어물장수)

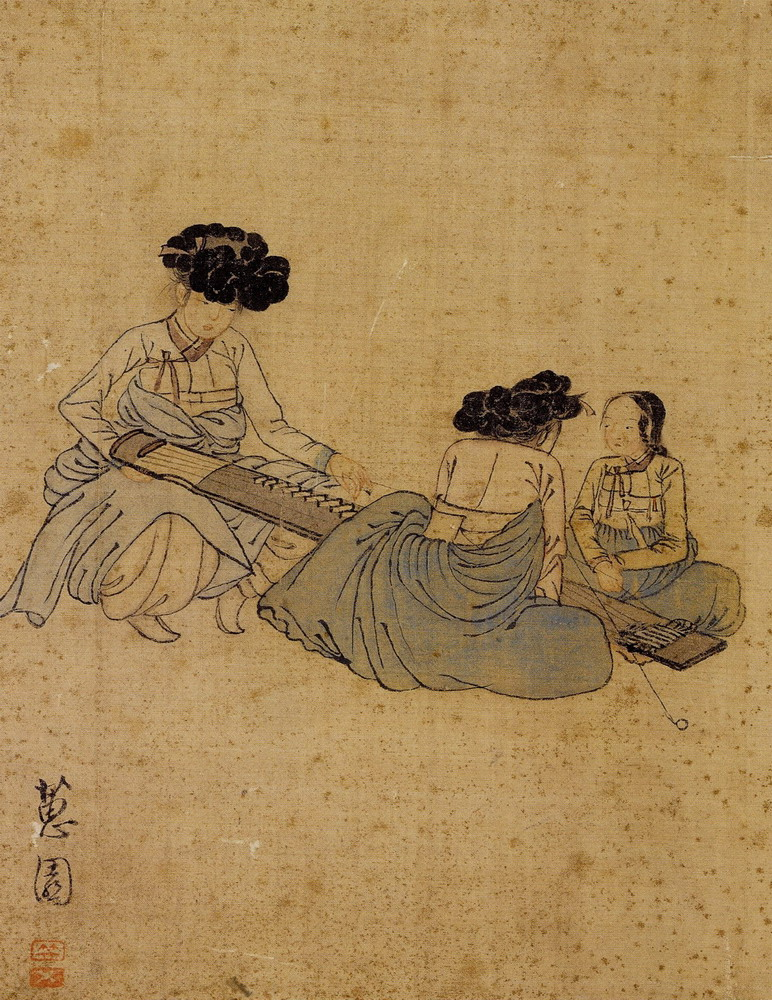
Women playing
geomungo
(거문고 고르는 여인)

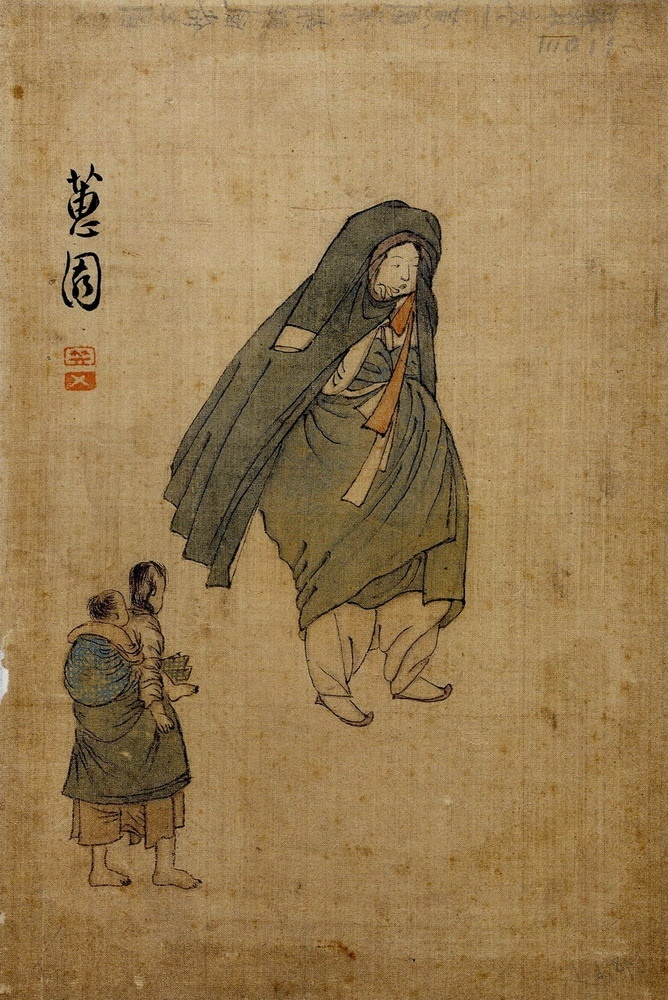
Woman with a jangot
(장옷 입은 여인)

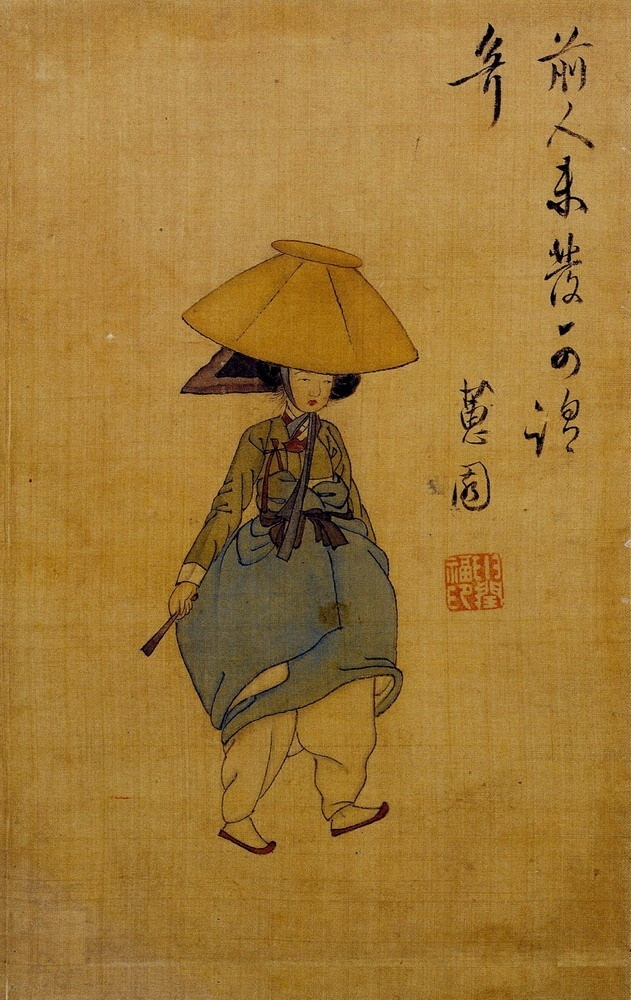
Woman with a red hat
(전모쓴 여인)

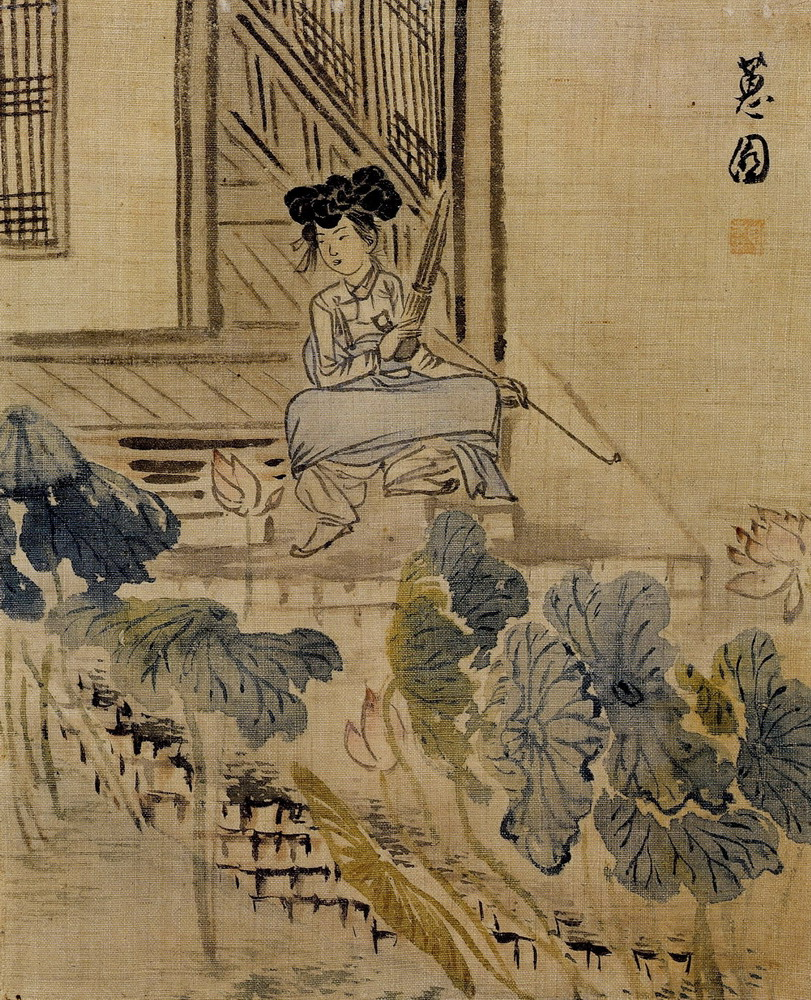
Woman at Yeondang
(연당의 여인)

Four paintings from the Pungsokdo Album. See Hyewon pungsokdo for a complete gallery of this album (30 paintings).

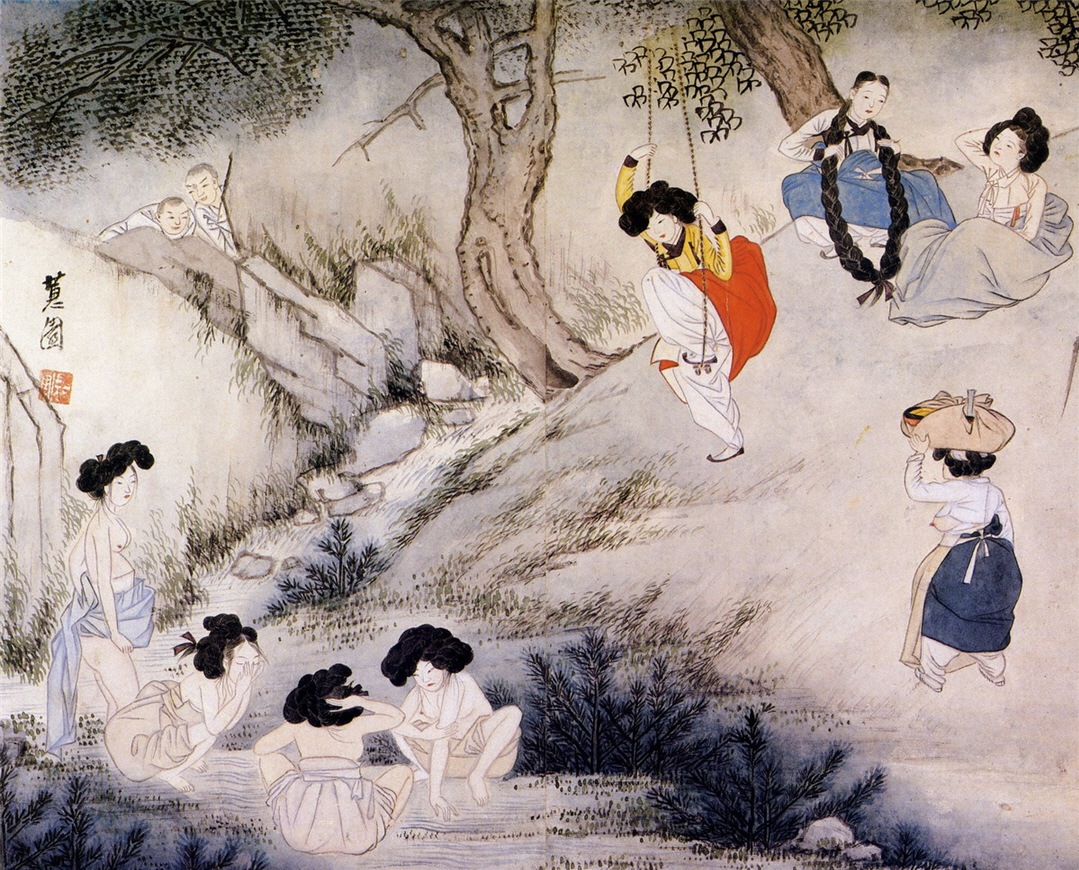
Scenery on Dano day
(단오풍정 端午風情)

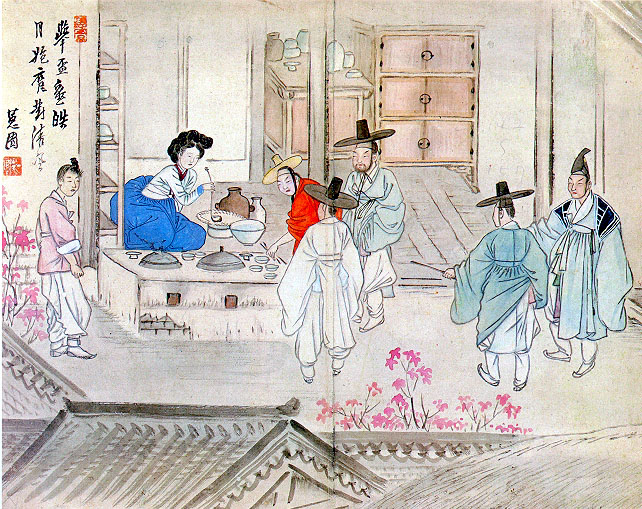
Holding a drinking bout
(주사거배 酒肆擧盃)

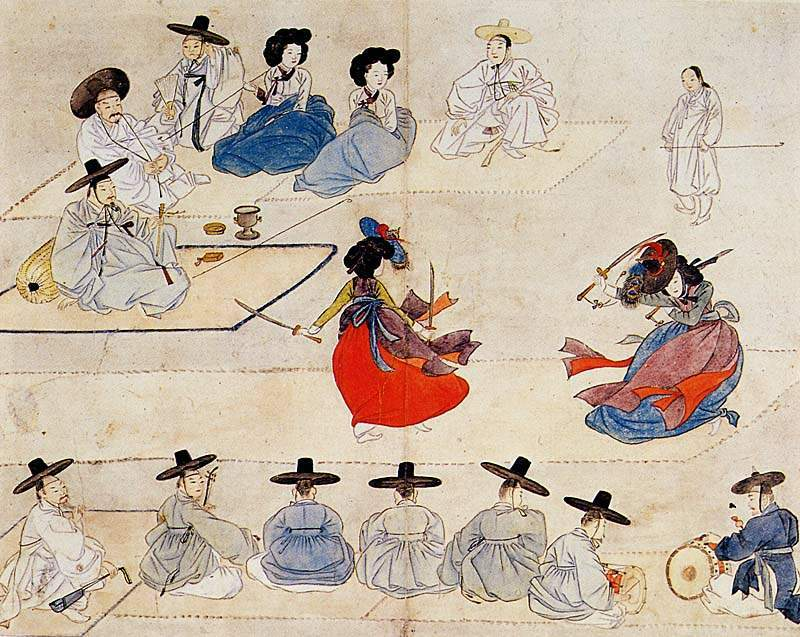
Dance with two swords
(쌍검대무 雙劍對舞)

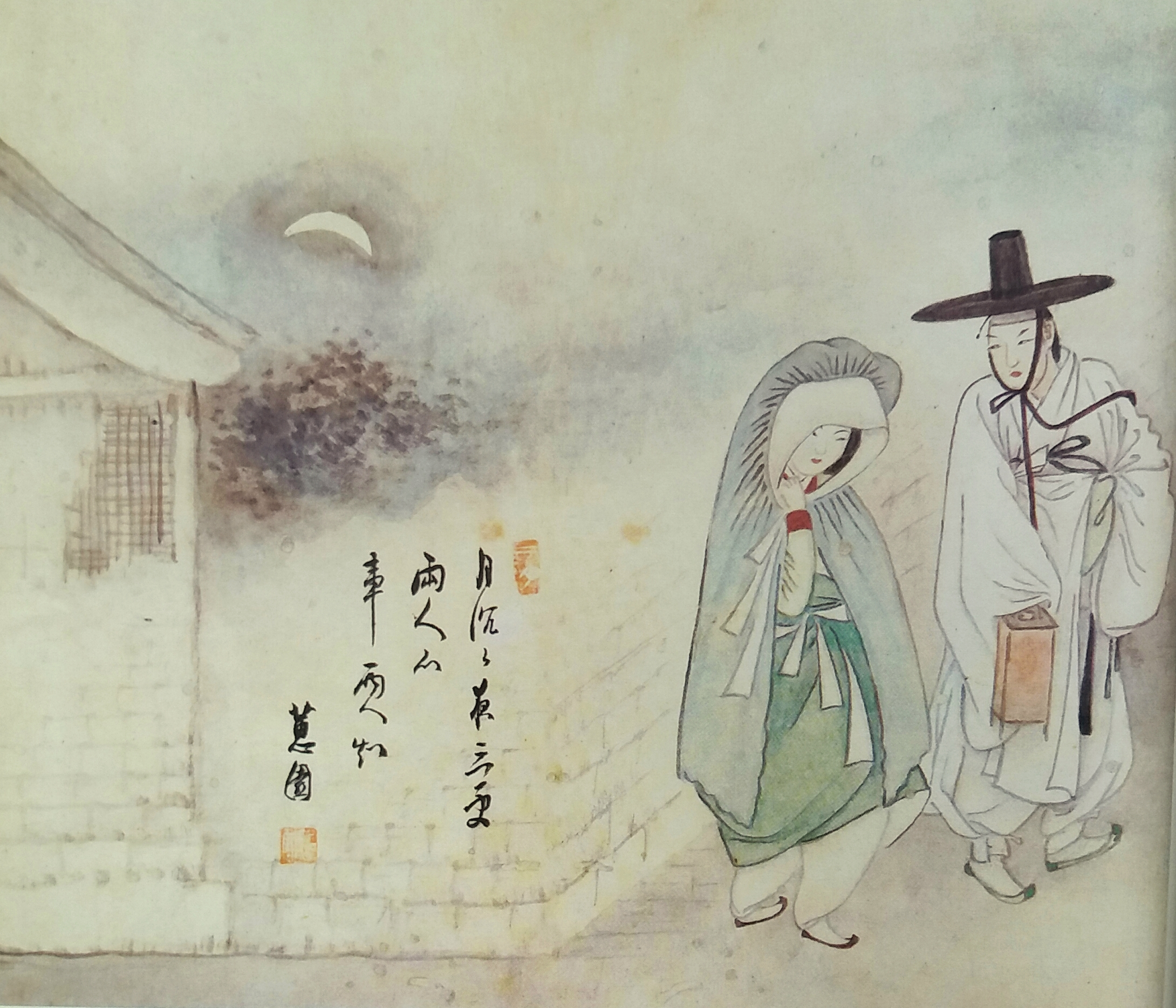
Lovers under the moon
(월하정인 月下情人)

== Fictional portrayals ==
=== Literature ===
In the novel Painter of the Wind by Lee Jung-myung, Sin is portrayed as a woman disguised as a man.

=== Film and television ===
- Portrayed by Moon Geun-young and Kim Yoo-jung in the 2008 SBS TV series Painter of the Wind.
- Portrayed by Kim Min-sun in the 2008 film Portrait of a Beauty.

== See also ==
- List of Korean painters
- Korean painting
- Korean art

== Bibliography ==
- Pratt, Keith L.; Rutt, Richard; Hoare, James E. (1999). Korea, A Historical and Cultural Dictionary. Durham East Asia Series. Routledge. p. 568. ISBN 978-0-7007-0463-7.
- Turner, Jane (2003). Grove Dictionary of Art. Oxford University Press, US. p. 32600. ISBN 978-0-1951-7068-9.
