= Jang Young-chul (politician) =

South Korean politician (1936–2023)

Jang Yeong-cheol

Member of the National Assembly of South Korea
- In office 30 May 1988 – 29 May 2000
- Preceded by: Park Jae-hong
- Succeeded by: Lee In-ki; Jeong Changhwa
- Constituency: Gunwi-gun–Chilgok-gun

Minister of Labor
- In office 5 December 1988 – 19 July 1989
- Preceded by: Choi Myung-heon
- Succeeded by: Choi Young-cheol

Personal details
- Born: 28 October 1936 Chilgok County, Korea, Empire of Japan
- Died: 12 October 2023 (aged 86)
- Party: NKP
- Education: Seoul National University; Yonsei University

Korean name
- Hangul: 장영철
- RR: Jang Yeongcheol
- MR: Chang Yŏngch'ŏl

Jang Young-chul (Korean: 장영철; 28 October 1936 – 12 October 2023) was a South Korean politician. A member of the New Korea Party, he served in the National Assembly from 1988 to 2000 and was Minister of Labor from 1988 to 1989. In 2000, he was appointed the chairman of the advisory Tripartite Committee.

Jang was a member of the Indong Jang clan. He died on 12 October 2023, at the age of 86.
