= Indong Jang clan =

Korean clan from North Gyeongsang Province

Indong Jang clan Indong Chang clan
- Country: Korea
- Current region: Gumi
- Founder: Chang Kŭmyong

Indong Jang clan (Korean: 인동 장씨; Hanja: 仁同 張氏) is a Korean clan, with their Bon-gwan (ancestral seat) in Gumi, North Gyeongsang Province. According to the 2000 South Korean census, the number of Indong Jang clan was 591315. Their founder was Chang Kŭmyong.

== Notable people ==
- Chang Kyŏngju
- Jang Ki-yong
- Jang Geun-suk
- Jang Dongwoo
- Jang Wooyoung
- Jang Gyu-ri
- Jang Ye-eun
- Jang Yoon-ju
- Jang Dong-yoon
- Jang Na-ra
- Jang Hee-ryung
- Chang Myon
- Jang Mi-ran
- Hui-bin Jang
- Jang Sung-min
- Jang Yun-jeong
- John Chang Yik
- Jang Tae-wan
- Chang Taek-sang
- Hasok Chang
- Ha-Joon Chang
- Chang Hyŏn'gwang
- Jang Dong-gun
- Jang Young-chul (politician)
