= Tohwasŏ =

Joseon government office for art

- Hangul: 도화서
- Hanja: 圖畫署
- RR: Dohwaseo
- MR: Tohwasŏ

Tohwasŏ (Korean: 도화서; Hanja: 圖畫署), translated as Korean Royal Academy of Painting, was an administrative office of the Joseon period responsible for drawing pictures requested by other government offices. It was originally called Tohwawŏn (도화원) during the Goryeo period until it was later renamed under Yejong, but its class was dropped, and the office was later renamed to Tohwasŏ.

== Organization and roles ==
According to the Kyŏngguk taejŏn, or National Code, the organizational structure of the Tohwasŏ comprised one Jeju (제주; 提調), two Byeolje (별제; 別提), and twenty miscellaneous workers. The organization's main task was to paint artworks for the nation, such as Uigwe. In addition, its artists drew portraits of the king, popular men and maps.

== Hwawon ==
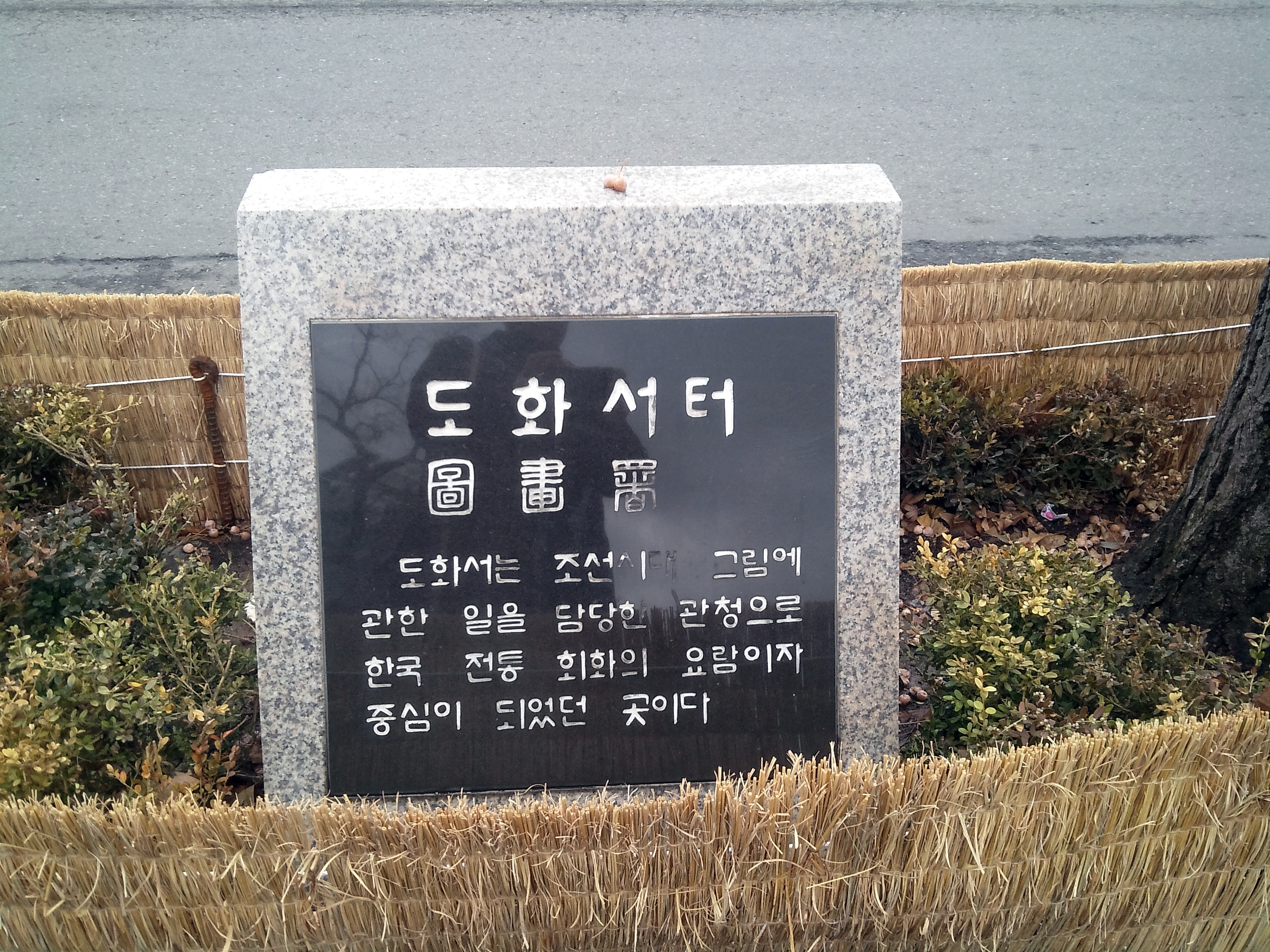
Notice about the place where a Tohwasŏ existed

Artists who worked within the Tohwasŏ were called Hwawon or Hwasa. An Kyŏn, who was a hwawon during the reign of Sejong the Great, is renowned for his Shan shui, and for the works Mongyudowondo and Sasipaljungdo. Kim Hongdo and Sin Yunbok were also renowned Hwawon for their drawings.

== See also ==
- Six Ministries of Joseon
- Académie royale de peinture et de sculpture
- Accademia di San Luca
- Academy of Fine Arts Vienna
- Prussian Academy of Arts
