= Singyesa =

Buddhist temple in Onjong-ri, North Korea

Coordinates: 38°40′33″N 128°10′32″E

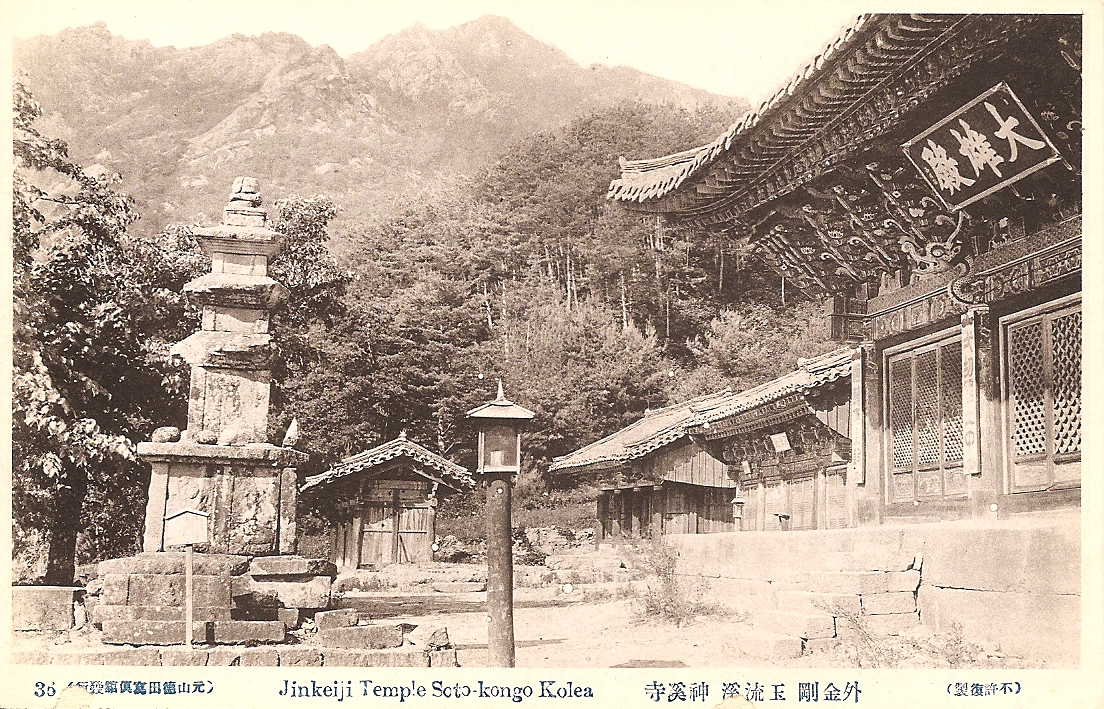
- Singye Temple in the 1930s

Korean name
- Hangul: 신계사
- Hanja: 神溪寺
- RR: Singyesa
- MR: Sin'gyesa

Singyesa (Korean: 신계사) is a Korean Buddhist temple located in Onjong-ri in Kosong County, Kangwon Province, North Korea. Once one of the largest of the hundreds of temples located in scenic Mount Kumgang, the complex was destroyed by US bombings during the Korean War. It was reconstructed in 2004 as an inter-Korean cultural project. It is listed as National Treasure #95.

== History ==
Singye Temple was founded under the kingdom of Silla in 519, which favored Buddhism as its state religion. Its location, in sacred Mount Kumgang, was especially chosen for its natural beauty, and the temple grew, it eventually became known as one of the four major temples of Mount Kumgang. Its fame lasted into the Japanese occupation, when the temple was well known as a tourist destination (under its Japanese pronunciation, Shinkei-ji).

The entire complex was destroyed by US fighter planes in 1951, at the start of the Korean War, as the US army believed the temple to be housing soldiers of the Korean People's Army; thus, despite its historical significance, the temple was firebombed. In 2004 reconstruction began on the temple, financed in part by the Jogye Order and the Korean Buddhist Association, and the temple complex was completed in 2006. Its reopening was attended by leading members of both groups.

== Composition ==
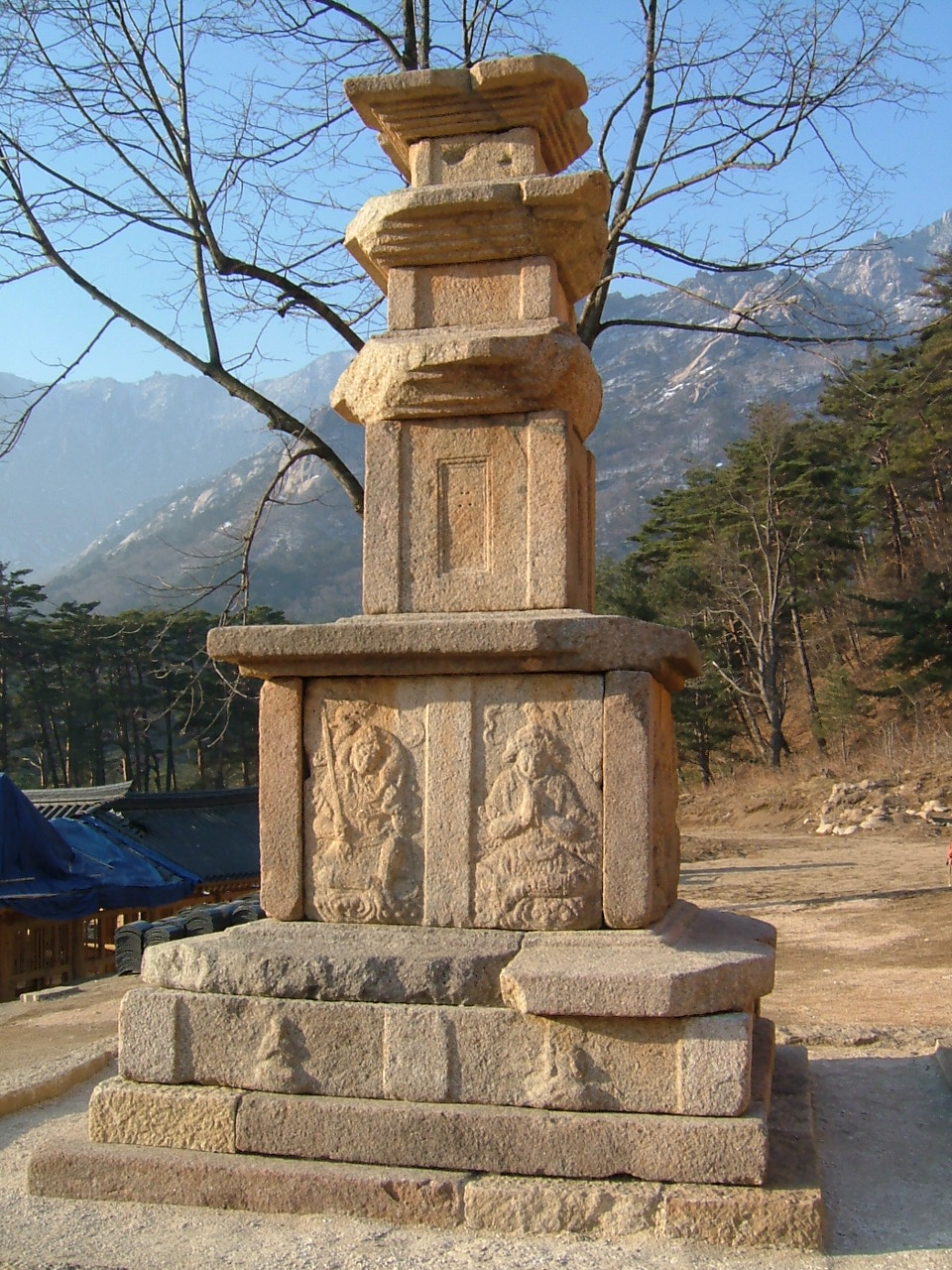
Silla-dynasty stone pagoda at Singye Temple

The temple was arranged with shrines, living quarters, and kitchens arranged around a courtyard fronting the main prayer hall.

Unlike many other Korean temples, which have free-standing gates at their entrance, the temple's entrance gate is located under Manse Pavilion (萬歳樓, "Pavilion of Ten thousand years"), a two-storey structure with storage on the first floor and a meditation room on the second.

In the temple's central courtyard stands a Silla Dynasty stone pagoda, carved with intricate depictions of various Buddhist guardian deities. This is the only artifact to have survived the US bombings of the temple.

Taeung Hall (大雄寶殿) was built as the temple's main prayer hall in the 18th century. By far the temple's largest building, it served as the focal point for the compound. It also housed a collection of icons and nine statues of various Buddhist guardians, saints (arhats), and deities. The hall was also destroyed by the American forces and was the first of the temple's buildings to be reconstructed.

To the right of the hall is the small Bell Pavilion, where stands a replica of the temple's original 16th-century bell, also destroyed in 1951.

== See also ==
- Four Great Temples of Mt. Kumgang
- National Treasures of North Korea
- Korean Buddhism
- Korean architecture
