= Kim Hongdo =

Joseon painter (1745–c.1806 to 1814)

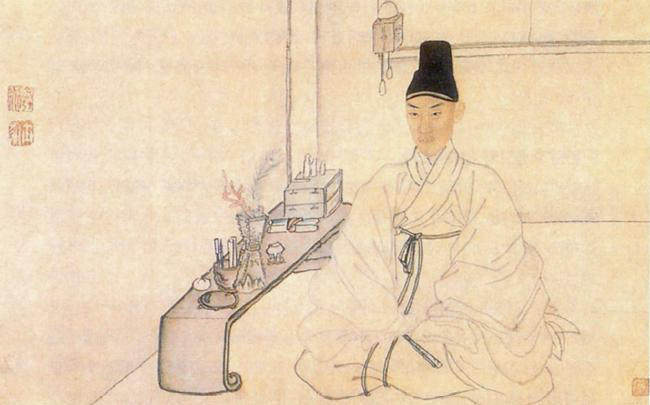

Korean name
- Hangul: 김홍도
- Hanja: 金弘道
- RR: Gim Hongdo
- MR: Kim Hongdo

Art name
- Hangul: 단원, 단구, 서호, 고면거사, 취화사, 첩취옹
- Hanja: 檀園, 丹邱, 西湖, 高眠居士, 醉畵士, 輒醉翁
- RR: Danwon, Dangu, Seoho, Gomyeongeosa, Chwihwasa, Cheopchwiong
- MR: Tanwŏn, Tan'gu, Sŏho, Komyŏn'gŏsa, Ch'wihwasa, Ch'ŏpch'wiong

Courtesy name
- Hangul: 사능
- Hanja: 士能
- RR: Saneung
- MR: Sanŭng

Kim Hongdo (Korean: 김홍도, 1745–c. 1806 to 1814) was a Korean painter during the Joseon dynasty. He is mostly remembered for his depictions of the everyday life of ordinary people, in a manner analogous to painters of the Dutch Golden Age. He was also widely known by his art name Tanwŏn (단원).

Active during the reign of King Yeongjo and King Jeongjo, he made a profound change in Joseon painting style. By boldly introducing Western painting methods that appeared to have been learned through the Qing Dynasty, he introduced a technique that revealed perspective through jokes and contrasts of colors.

== Biography ==
Kim was a member of the Gimhae Kim clan. He grew up in present-day Ansan, South Korea. At the age of 7, Kim Hongdo studied under the renowned master Pyoam Kang Sehwang, who was then living in seclusion in Ansan. In 1766, at the age of 21, on the recommendation of Kang Sehwang, he entered the royal service as a member (hwawon) of the Dohwaseo, the official painters of the Joseon court. In 1771, he painted the portrait of the Royal Heir (the future King Jeongjo). In 1773, he assisted Byeon Sang-byeok when painting the Royal Portrait of King Yeongjo (1694–1724–1776).

In 1776, he painted the "Nineteen Taoist Immortals", that skyrocketed his reputation as a painter. At the same time, the new instated King Jeongjo (1752–1776–1800) commissioned him for many institutional paintings.

He died in loneliness and poverty, though the circumstances, and even the year are unknown. Depending on the source, some state that he died in 1806, 1810, or after 1814.

== Legacy ==
Kim is remembered today as one of the "Three Wons," together with Hyewon and Owon. He is also often joined to Owon and the 15th-century painter An Gyeon as one of Joseon's three greatest painters.

The city of Ansan, where he spent his youth and learned his craft, has memorialized him in many ways. The district of Danwon-gu is named after him, as is Ansan's annual "Danwon Art Festival." Many public places have been designed in imitation of his works.

== Gallery ==
Various sources have various opinions about what could be a 'top ten' list for Kim Hongdo. The most important fact is how successful was Kim Hongdo in all the various types of paintings.

Towooart provides a short notice and an argumented selection of paintings. The Korean Copyright Commission lists 757 paintings, 7 calligraphies and 4 moldings for Kim Hongdo. Some paintings have multiple descriptions: often a sepia version is given with a very fine resolution, and a colorful one with a lower resolution. An example is "Feast for the Pyongyang Governor" (평양감사 향안도).

- The paintings that launched the reputation of Kim Hongdo.

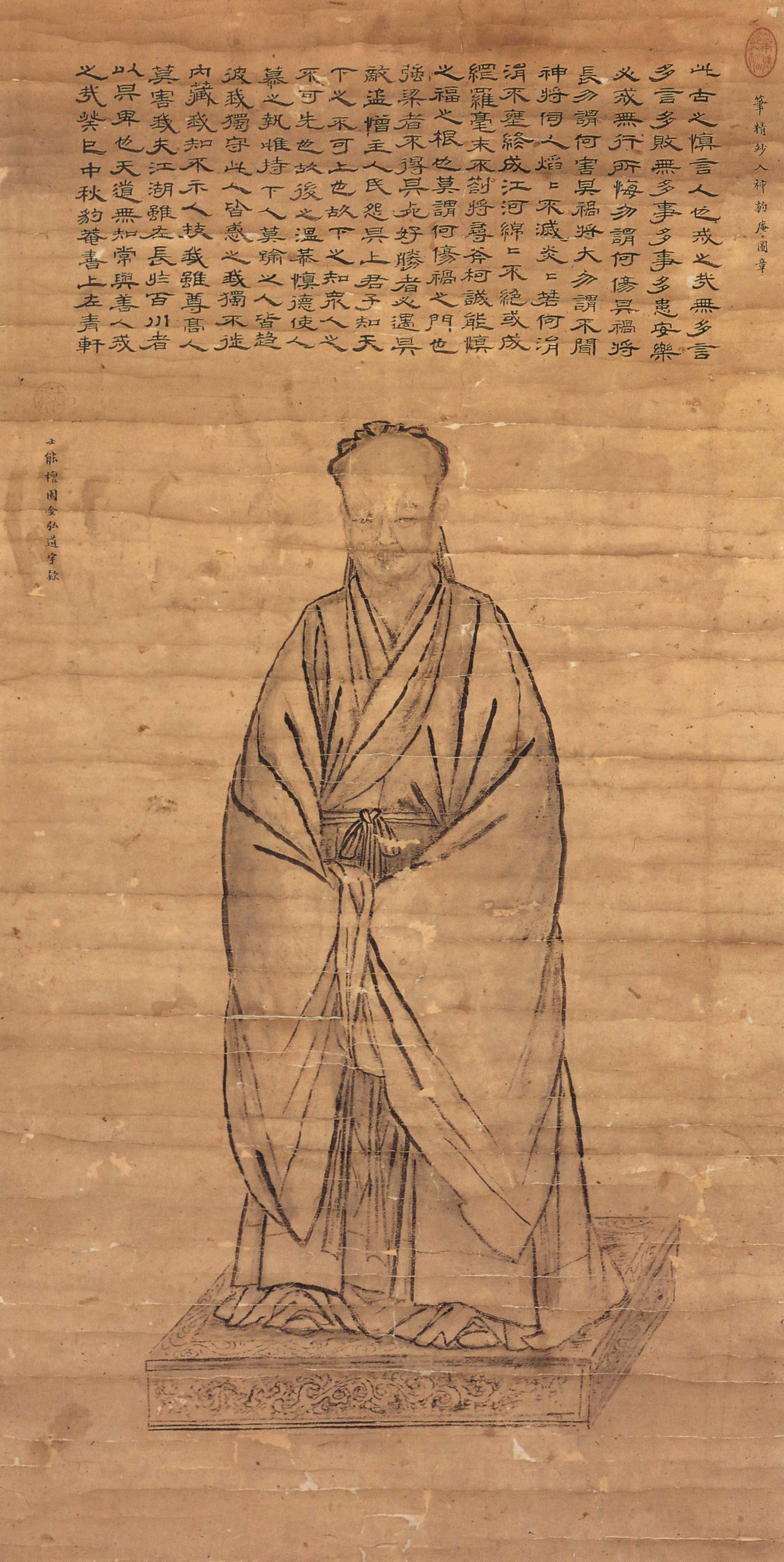
신언인도 (1773)
Indian Prophet

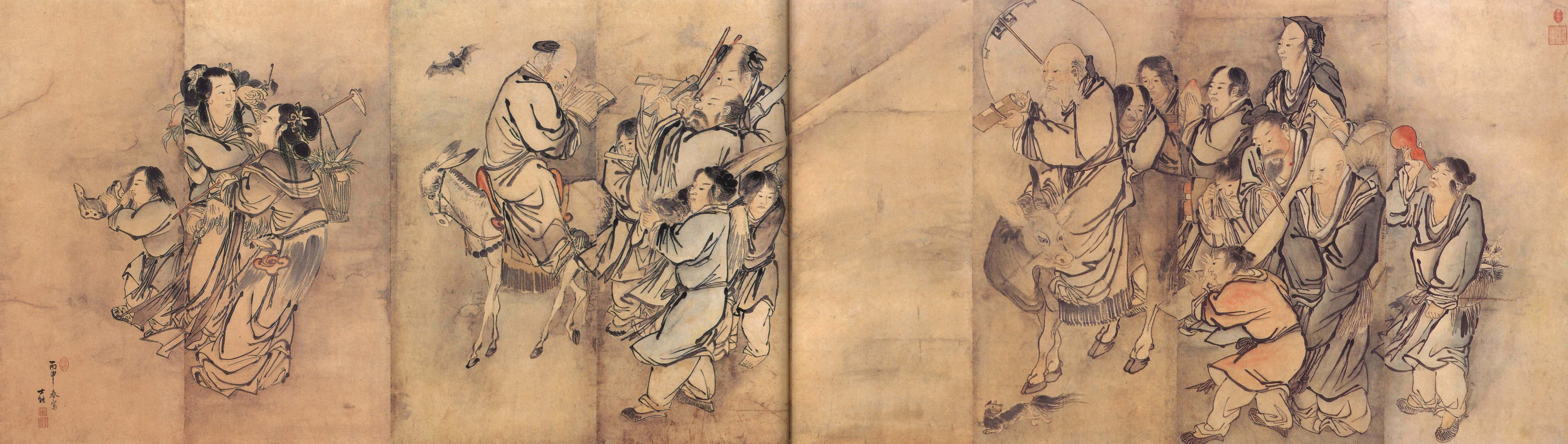
Gunseondo 군선도 (1776)
The Nineteen Taoist Immortals

- 'Literati' paintings.
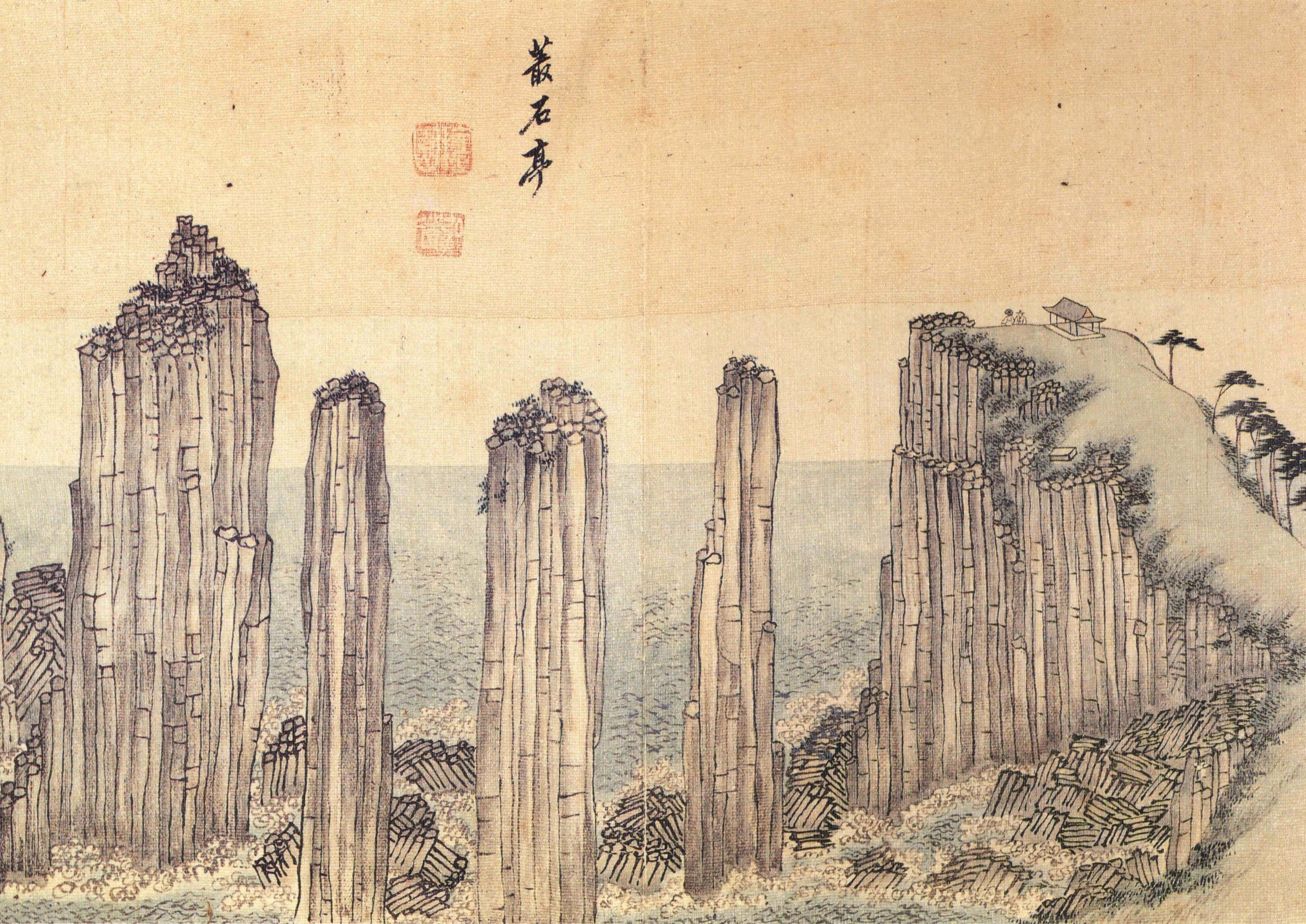
ChongSeokJeong

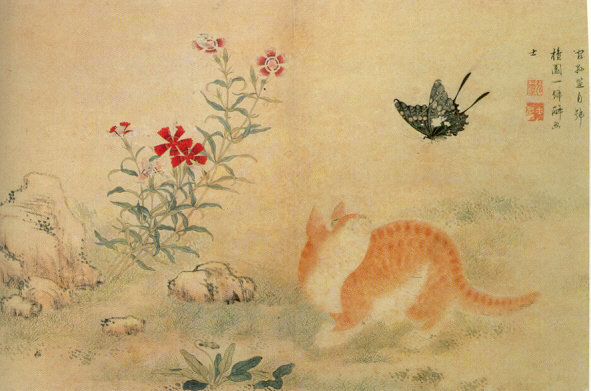
A cat and a butterfly
Hwangmyonongjeopdo

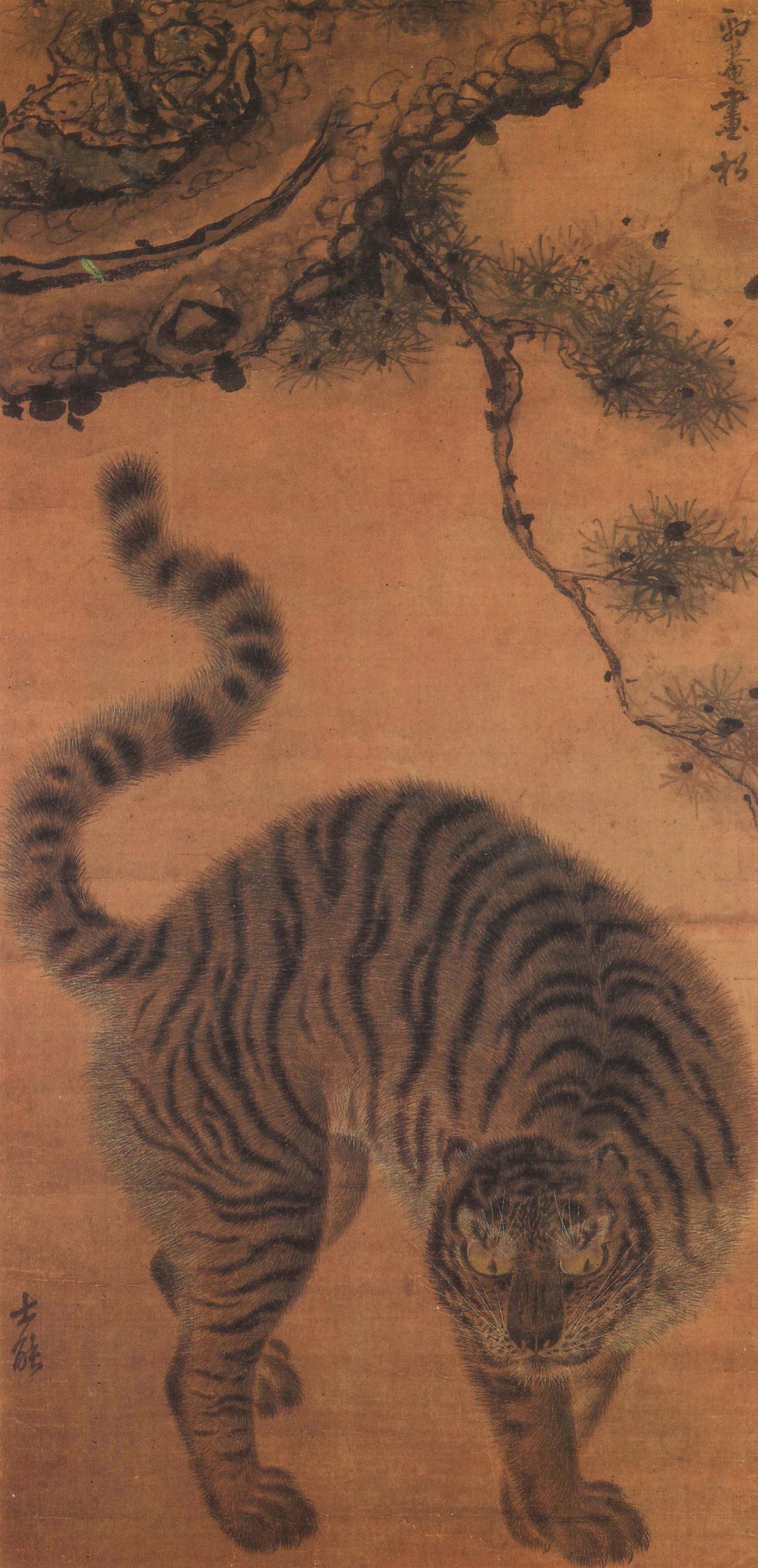
Tiger under a pine tree
Songhamaenghodo

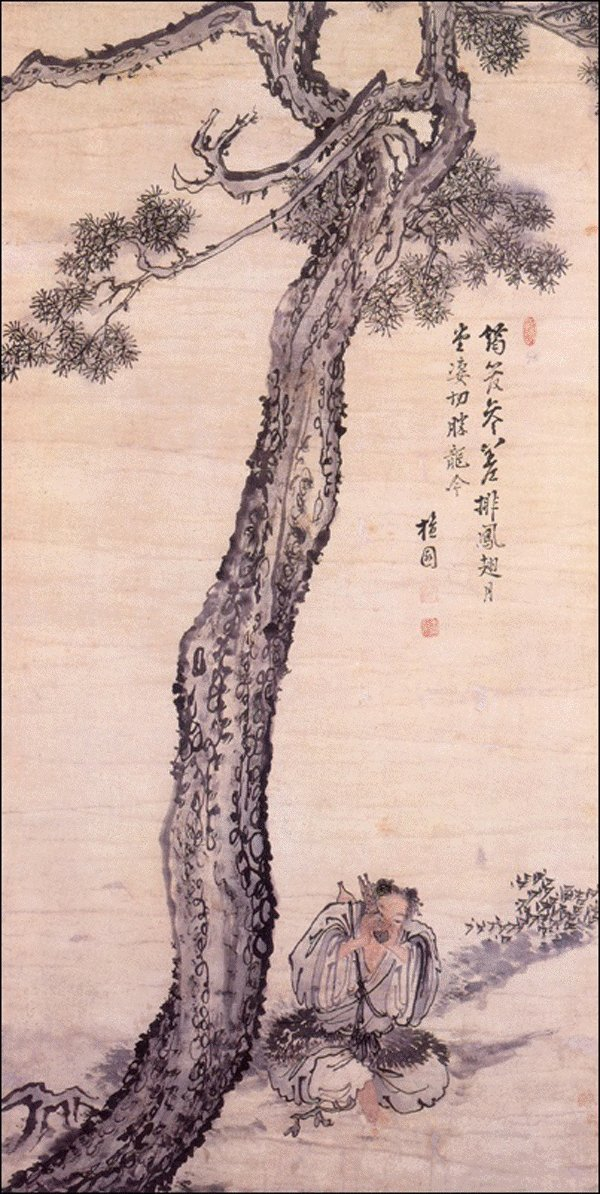
Drunkard under a tree
Songhachwisaengdo

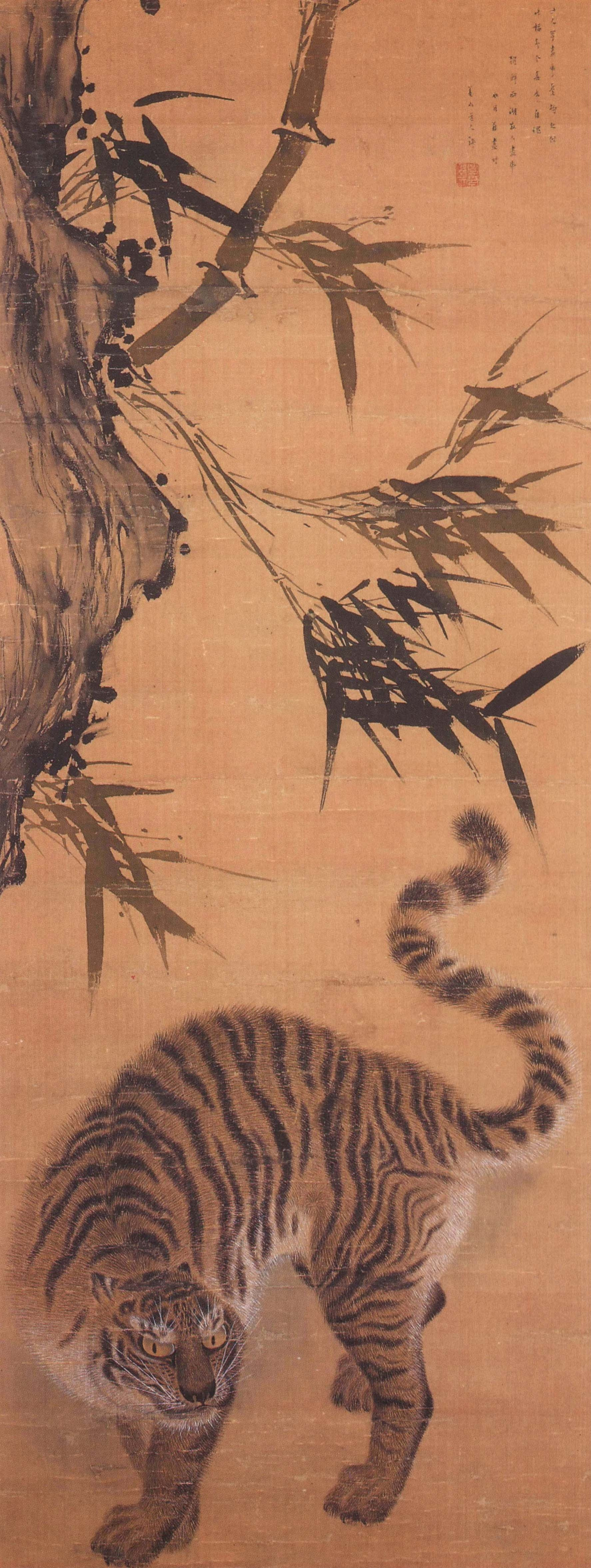
Tiger underneath a Bamboo
Jukhamenghodo
- Official paintings
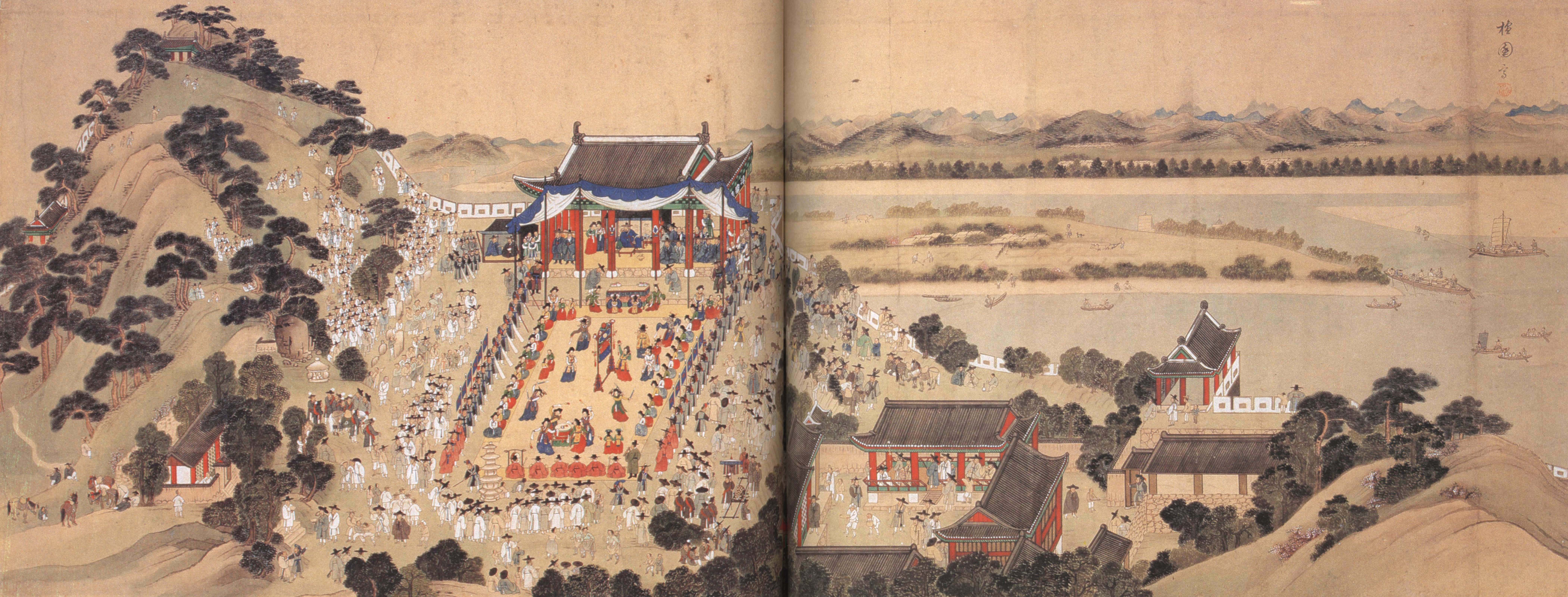
Feast for the Pyongyang Governor (1, Dinner)
- The designated painter of the King

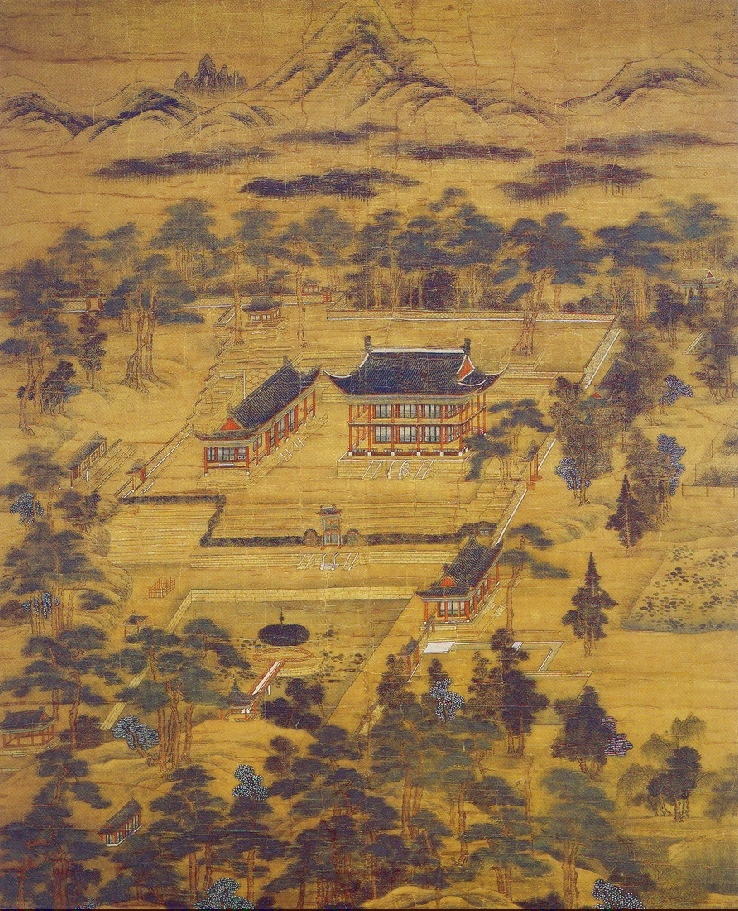
Kyujanggak

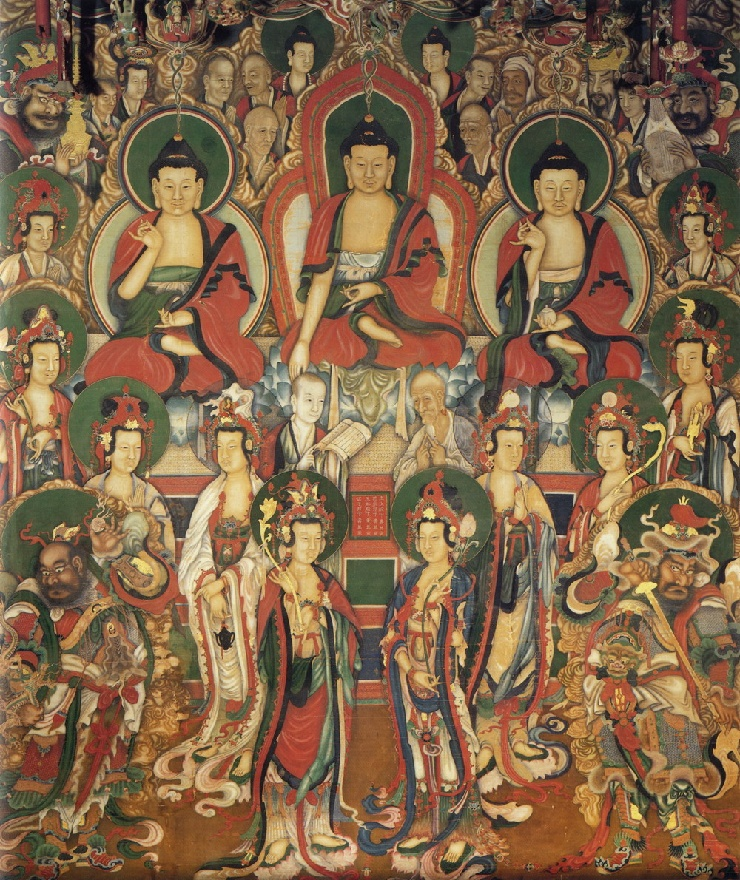
Main hall of Yongjusa

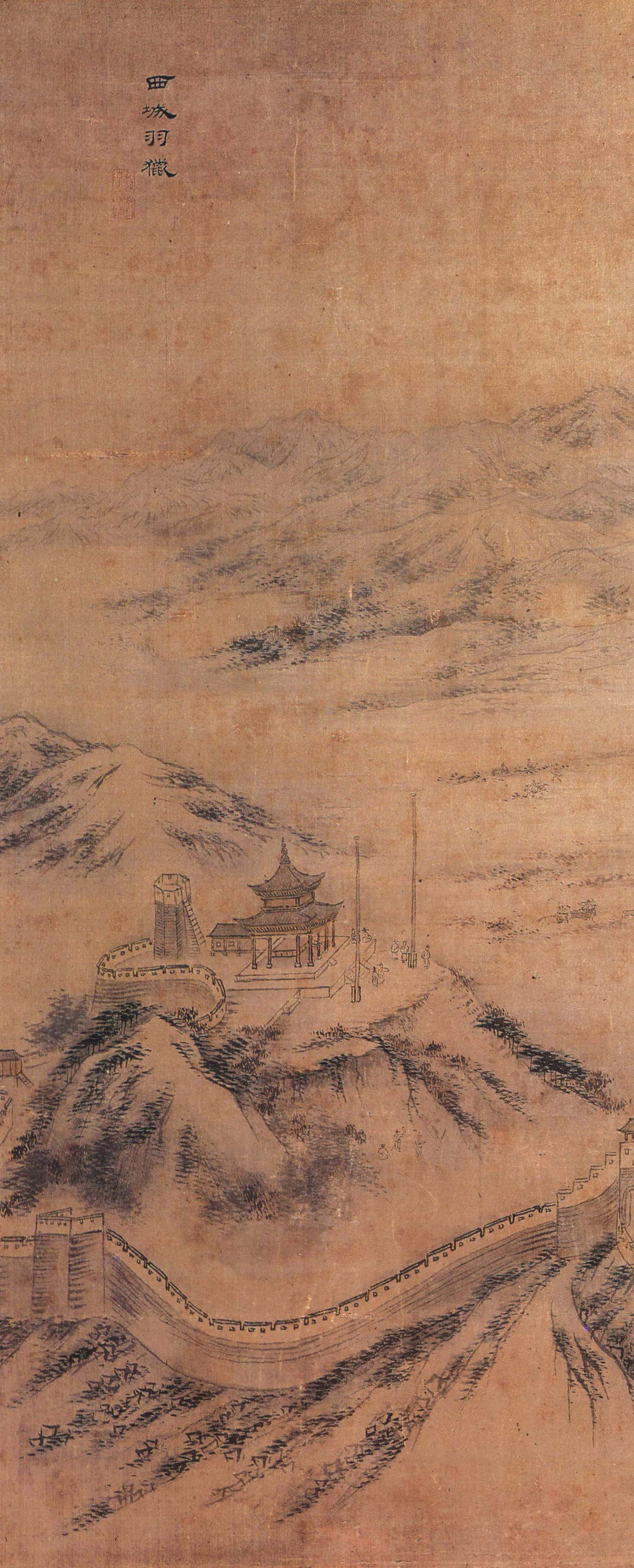
Seojangdae

- "Genre paintings". Among them, the album Danwon pungsokdo provides a serie of 25 paintings. Here are only four of them:
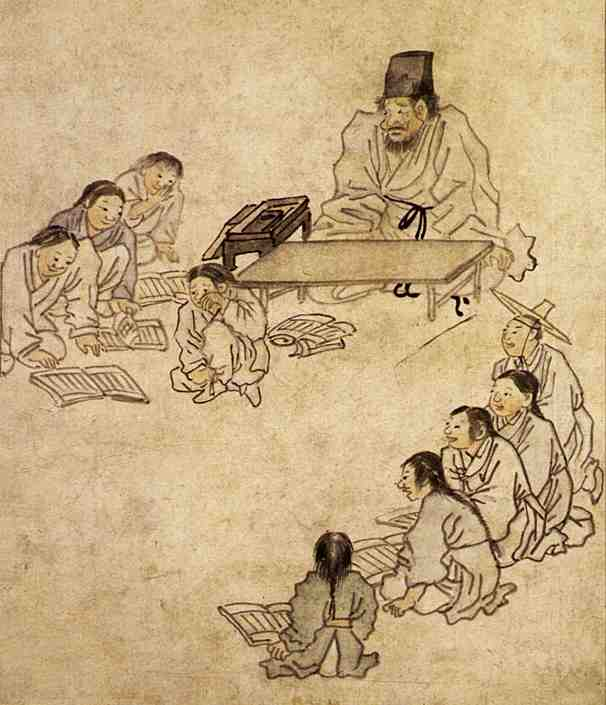
Teacher and pupils
Seodang (서당:書堂)

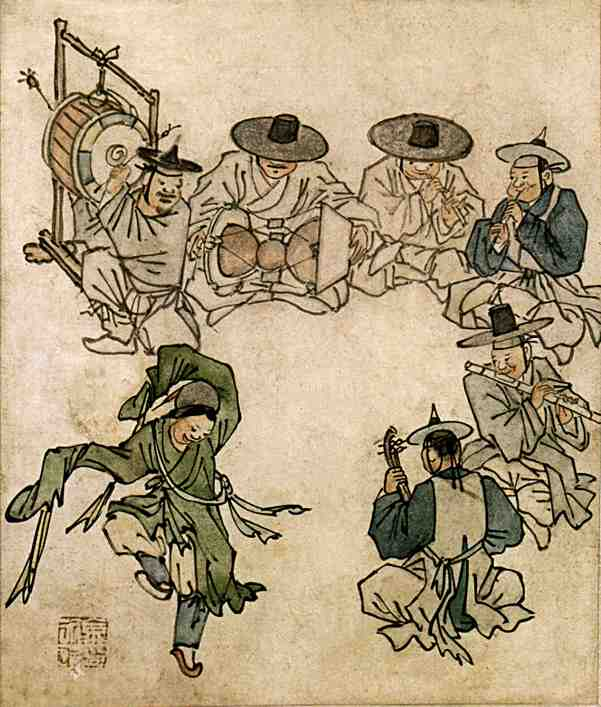
Dancing boy
Mudong (무동:舞童)

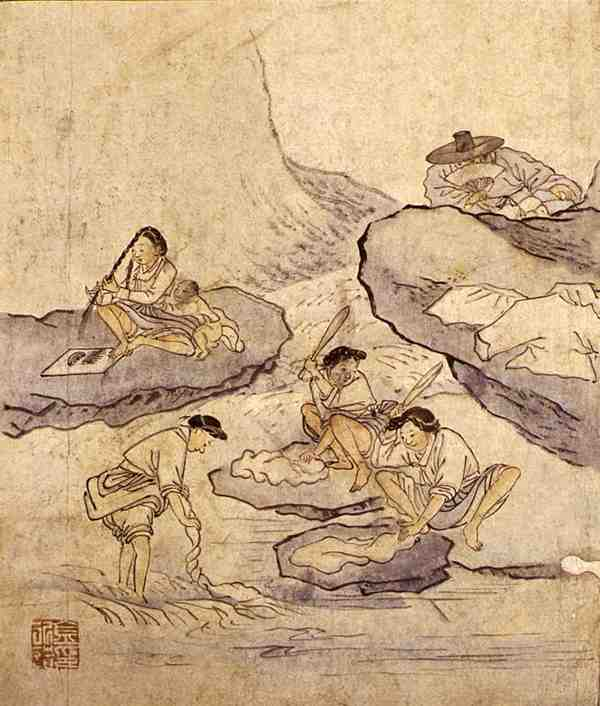
Washing place
Bbalraeteo (빨래터:漂母)

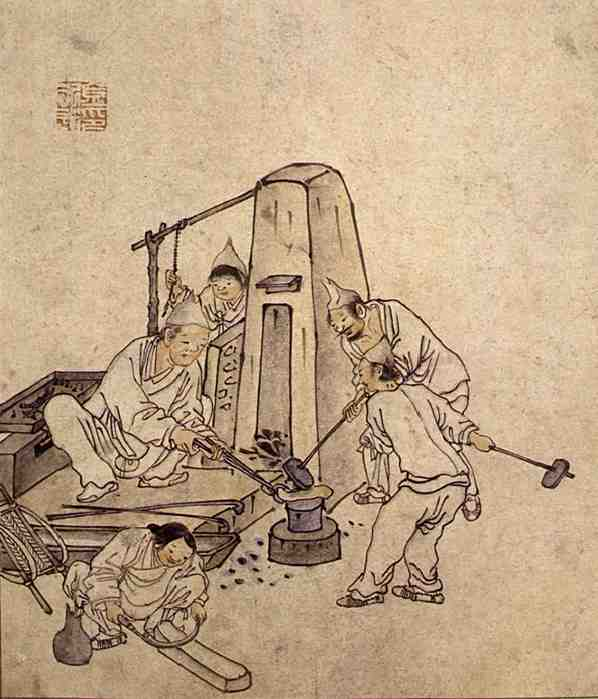
Forge Daejanggan (대장간)

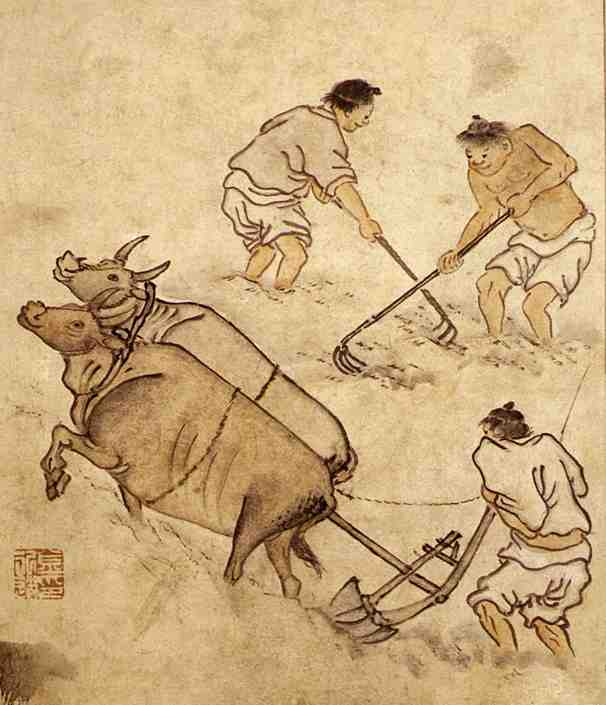
Plowing a rice field
Nongali (논갈이)

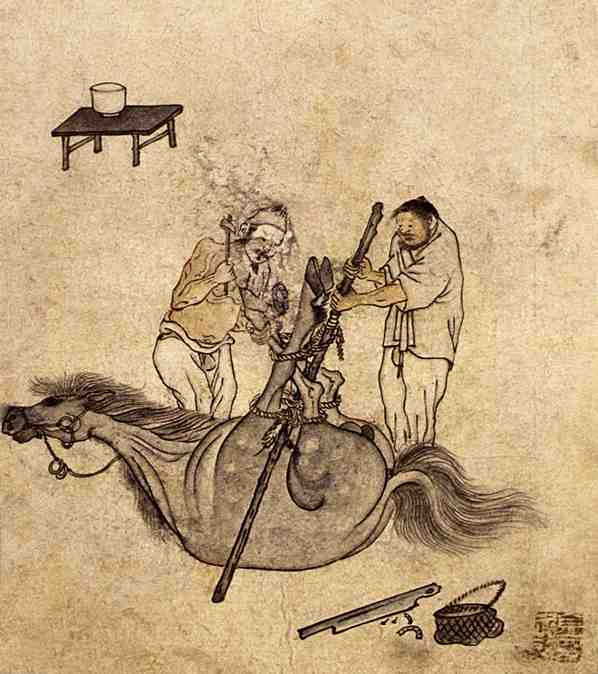
Shoeing a horse
Pyeonjabakgi (편자박기)

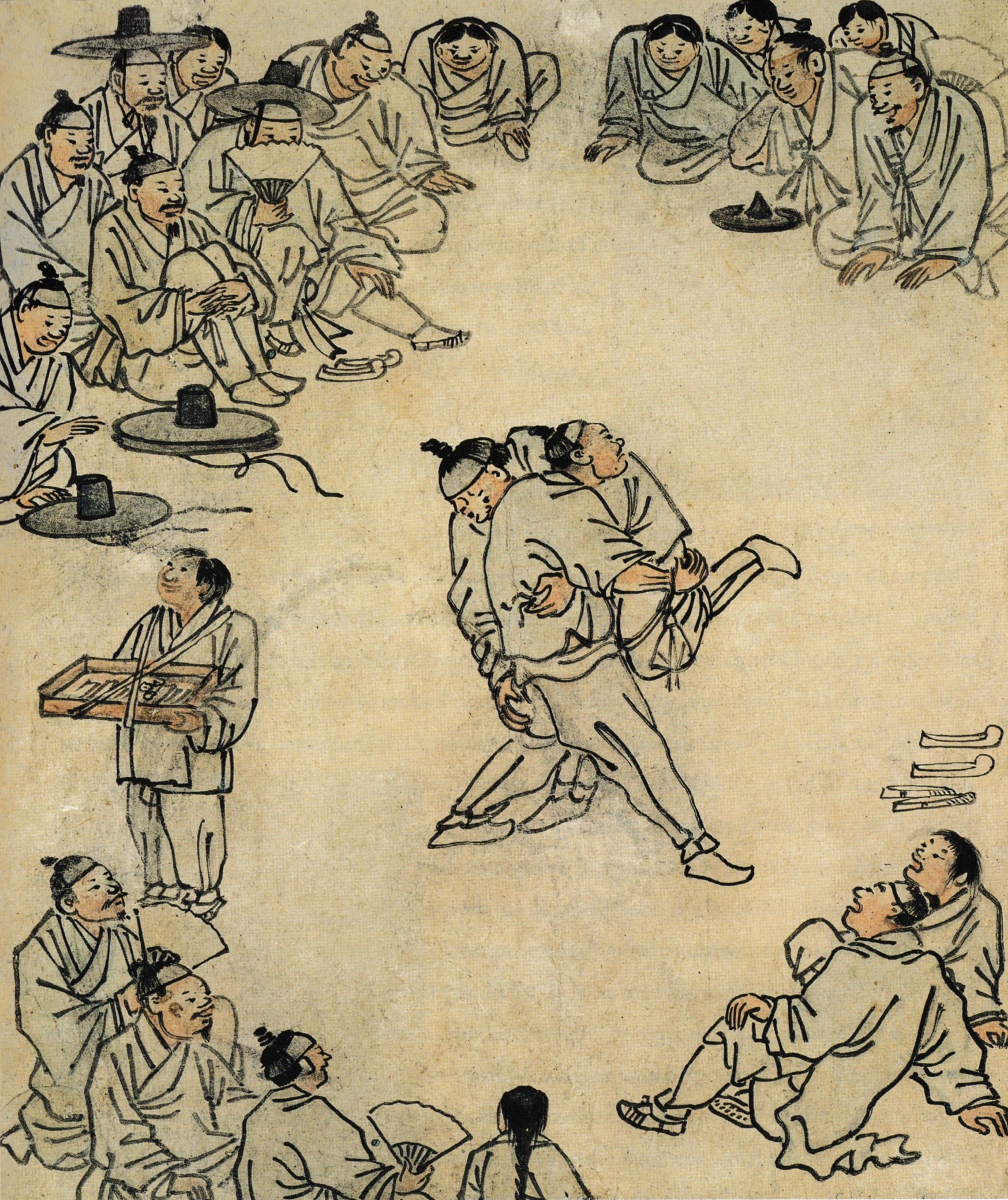
Ssireum (씨름)

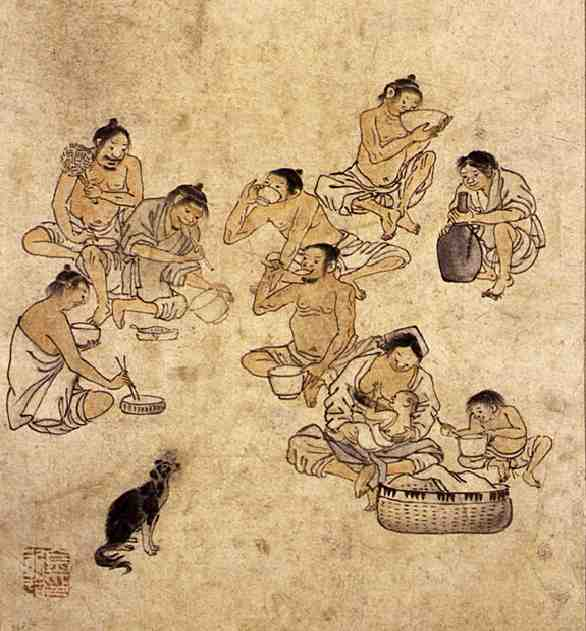
Lunch time
Jeomsim (점심)
- After 1800 and the death of King Jeongjo.
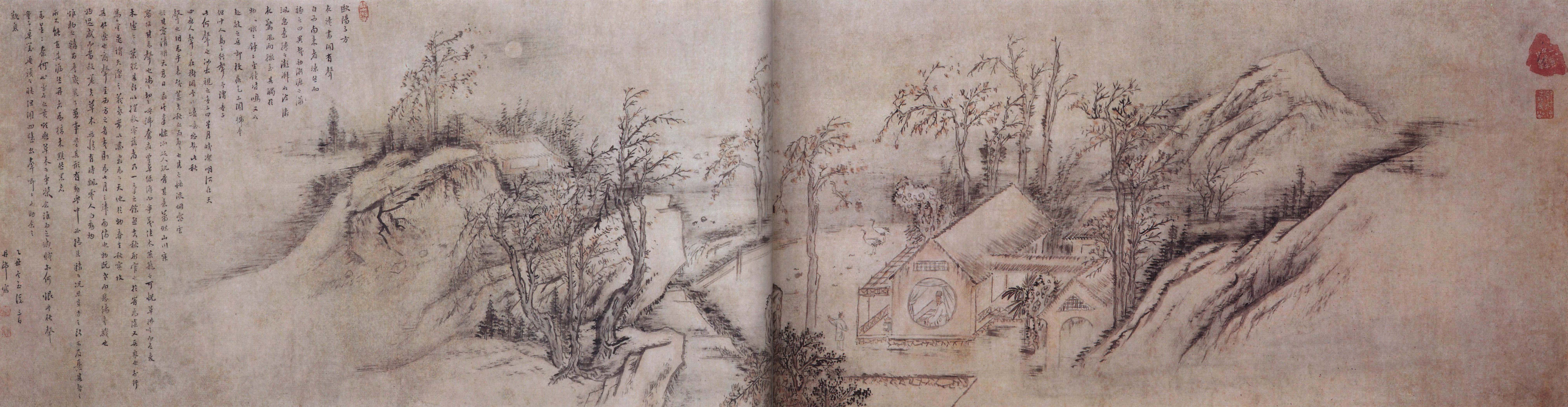
Chuseongbu 추성부도, Landscape in night of autumn [poem by Ouyang Xiu (1007~1072)]
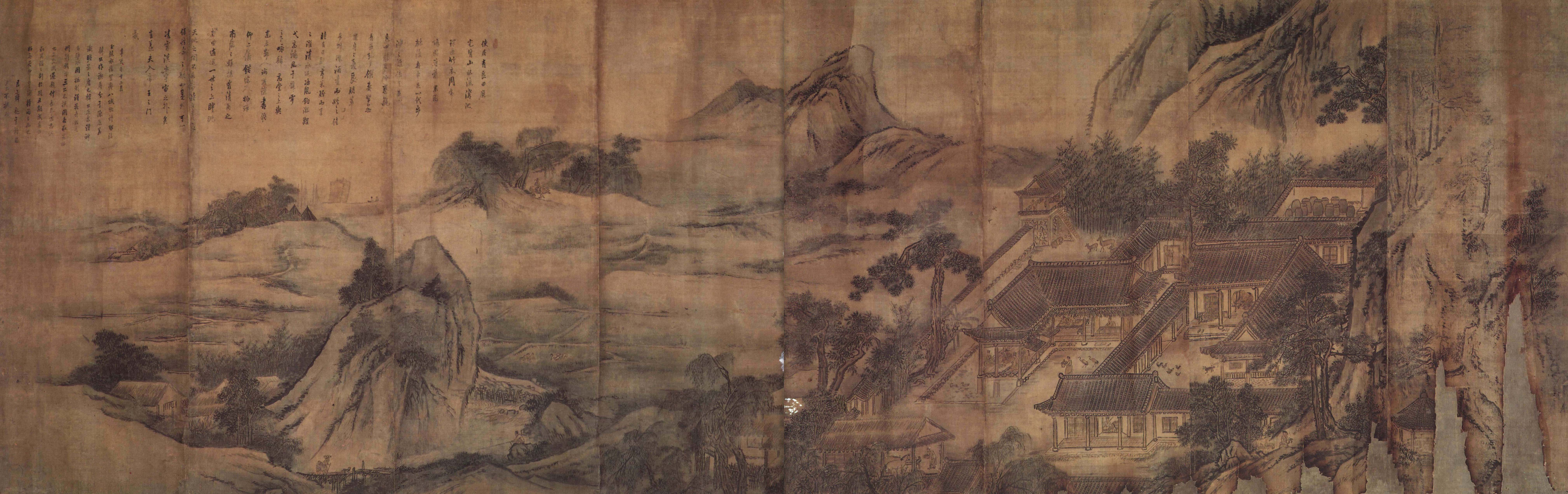
Samgongbulhwando 삼공불환, The Nature Better than the Official Ranks

== In popular culture ==
=== Literature ===
The novel Painter of the Wind, by Lee Jung-myung, is centered on Gim and Sin Yun-bok, who is portrayed as a woman disguised as a man.

=== Film and television ===
- Portrayed by Park Shin-yang in the 2008 SBS TV series Painter of the Wind.
- Portrayed by Kim Young-ho in the 2008 film Portrait of a Beauty.
- Portrayed by Kim Da-hyun in the 2011 SBS TV series Warrior Baek Dong-soo.

== See also ==
- Danwon pungsokdo cheop
- Korean painting
- List of Korean painters

== Bibliography ==
- Pratt, Keith L.; Rutt, Richard; Hoare, James E. (1999). Korea, A Historical and Cultural Dictionary. Durham East Asia Series. Routledge. p. 568. ISBN 978-0-7007-0463-7.
- Turner, Jane (2003). Grove Dictionary of Art. Oxford University Press, US. p. 32600. ISBN 978-0-1951-7068-9.
- Oh, Joosok, Adjunct Professor, Chung-Ang University (2007). "The Life and Art of Kim Hong-do". Korean Art and Archeology. 1. National Museum of Korea: 34–45.
- KCC (2013). "Kim Hong-do". Database. Korean Copyright Commission. Archived from the original on 2015-07-13. (in Korean)
- TWA (2013). "Kim Hong-do". Art Database. Towooart. (in Korean)
