= Korean art =

Korean art

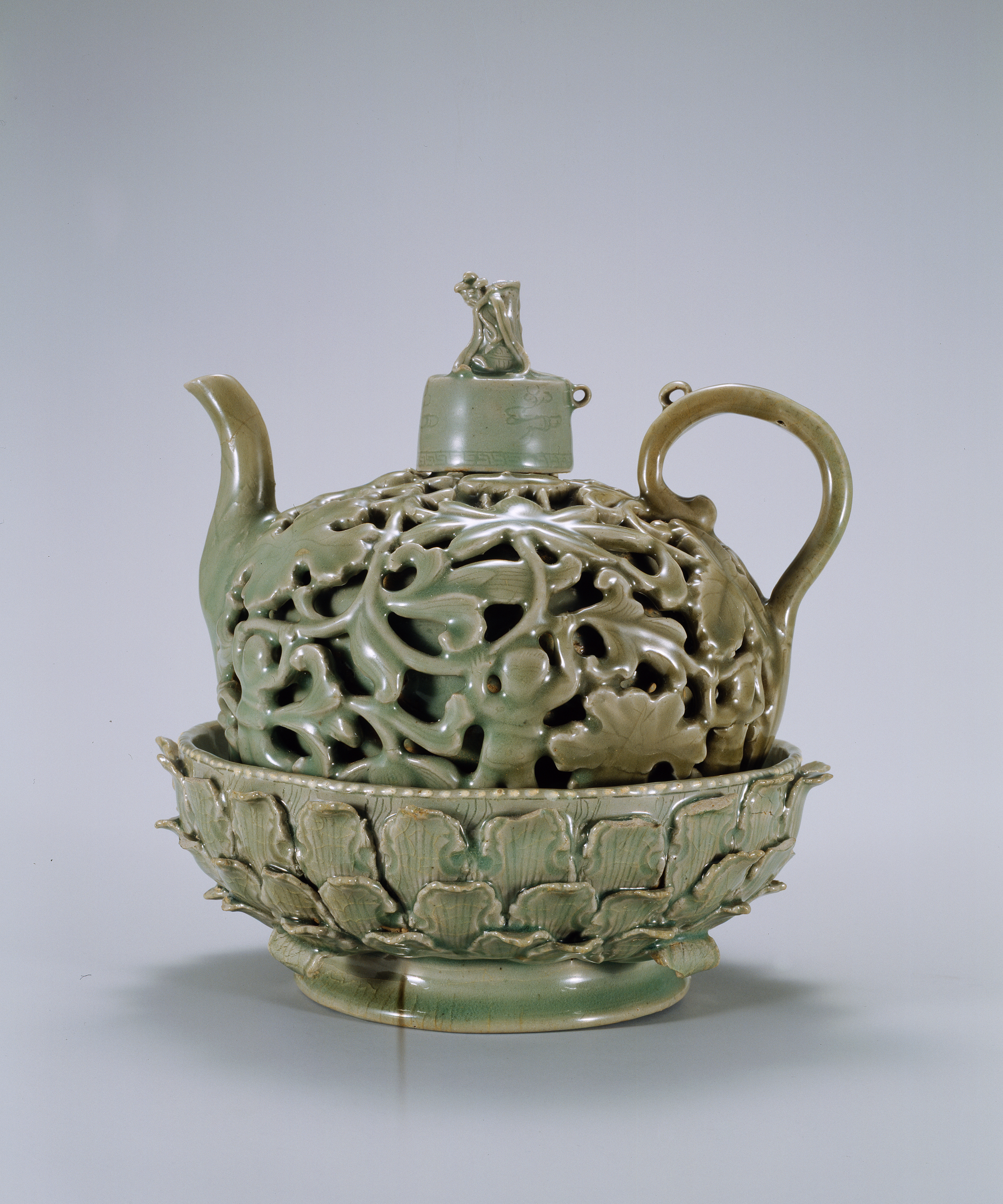
Celadon Ewer with Openwork Lotus and Child Design, Goryeo Dynasty

Korean arts include traditions in calligraphy, music, painting and pottery, often marked by the use of natural forms, surface decoration and bold colors or sounds.

The earliest examples of Korean art consist of Stone Age works dating from 3000 BC. These mainly consist of votive sculptures and more recently, petroglyphs, which were rediscovered.

This early period was followed by the art styles of various Korean kingdoms and dynasties. Korean artists sometimes modified Chinese traditions with a native preference for simple elegance, spontaneity, and an appreciation for purity of nature.

The Goryeo dynasty (918–1392) was one of the most prolific periods for a wide range of disciplines, especially pottery.

The Korean art market is concentrated in the Insadong district of Seoul where over 50 small galleries exhibit and occasional fine arts auctions. Galleries are cooperatively run, small and often with curated and finely designed exhibits. In every town there are smaller regional galleries, with local artists showing in traditional and contemporary media. Art galleries usually have a mix of media. Attempts at bringing Western conceptual art into the foreground have usually had their best success outside of Korea in New York, San Francisco, London and Paris.

== History ==
Professionals have begun to acknowledge and sort through Korea's own unique art culture and important role in not only transmitting Chinese culture, but also assimilating and creating a unique culture of its own. "An art given birth to and developed by a nation is its own art".

=== Neolithic era ===
Comb-patterned pottery

Humans have occupied the Korean Peninsula from at least c. 50,000 BC. Pottery dated to approximately 7,000 BC has been found. This pottery was made from clay and fired over open or semi-open pits at temperatures around 700 degrees Celsius.

The earliest pottery style, dated to circa 7,000 BC, were flat-bottomed wares (yunggi-mun) were decorated with relief designs, raised horizontal lines and other impressions.

Jeulmun-type pottery, is typically cone-bottomed and incised with a comb-pattern appearing circa 6,000 BC in the archaeological record. This type of pottery is similar to Siberian styles.

Mumun-type pottery emerged approximately 2000 BC and is characterized as large, undecorated pottery, mostly used for cooking and storage.

=== Bronze Age ===
Between 2000 BC and 300 BC bronze items began to be imported and made in Korea. By the seventh century BC, an indigenous bronze culture was established in Korea as evidenced by Korean bronze having a unique percentage of zinc. Items manufactured during this time were weapons such as swords, daggers, and spearheads. Also, ritual items such as mirrors, bells, and rattles were made. These items were buried in dolmens with the cultural elite. Additionally, iron-rich red pots began to be created around circa 6th century. Comma-shaped beads, usually made from nephrite, known as kokkok have also been found in dolmen burials. Kokkok may be carved to imitate bear claws. Another Siberian influence can be seen in rock drawings of animals that display a "life line" in the X-ray style of Siberian art.

=== Iron Age ===
The Korean Iron Age began around the 5th to 4th century BC with the arrival of the Chinese iron culture; it most likely began through the contacts with the North-East Chinese state of Yan and was later developed through the Chinese Lelang Commandery. Koreans have always tried to import Chinese technology and reshaped it in their own in order to make it uniquely Korean and in order to develop new technology. The introduction of Chinese iron culture contributed to the rapid development of ancient Korea. The Koreans then localized the Chinese iron culture into a new form of Korean iron casting technology. By 300 BC, iron was widely used in Korea; however, the Iron culture of Korea continued to be deeply influenced by China which is attested by numerous archeological artifacts. Korean pottery advanced with the introduction of the potters wheel and climbing kiln firing.

=== Three Kingdoms ===
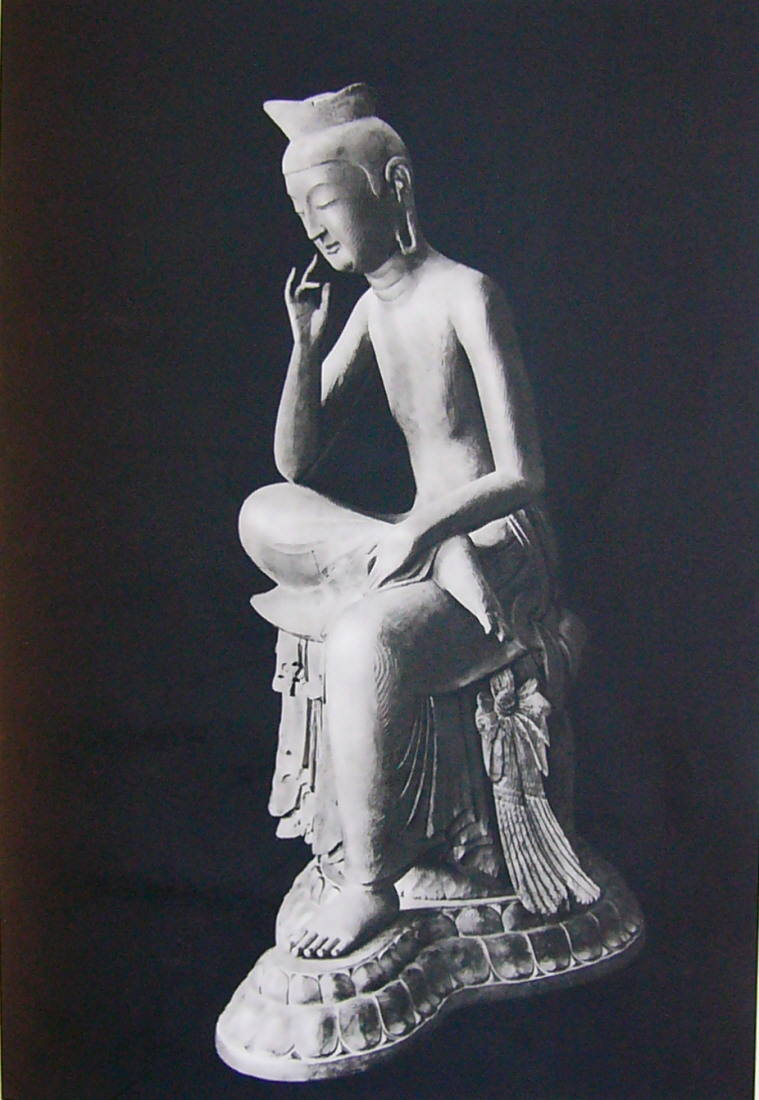
Pensive Bodhisattva Maitreya from Silla, 7th century

This period began circa 57 BC to 668 AD. Three Korean kingdoms, Goguryeo, Baekje, and Silla vied for control over the peninsula.

==== Goguryeo ====
Buddhist missionaries introduced Buddhism to Goguryeo in 372 CE, which then covered the central and southern parts of Manchuria and the northern half of modern-day Korea. As Buddhism infiltrated the culture, Goguryeo kings began commissioning art and architecture dedicated to Buddha.

===== Goguryeo Tomb Murals =====
A notable aspect of Goguryeo art are tomb murals that vividly depict everyday aspects of life in the Korean ancient kingdom as well as its culture. Goguryeo tomb paintings offer a chronological timeline of everyday life based on when the tomb was constructed and painted. Everyday customs were displayed within the tomb paintings as an attempt to surround the deceased with positive memories of their previous personal lives. Subjects are often depicted alone or spouse, enjoying bountiful nature scenes like Korea’s fields and mountains, and participating in joyous behavior such as dancing and playing. For example, in the Deokheung-li tomb, a mural painting in the front room showcases the master of the tomb surrounded by his servants – a depiction of his prosperous life. The portraits also displayed class-adjacent factors in Korean society of the time by displaying figures as abstractly small or large in accordance with their social position. Abstract designs and fantastical elements are also showcased within Goguryeo tomb paintings. Elaborate ceiling construction led to patterns such as constellations and clouds. Mythical animals were painted within the tombs as they were believed to have the ability to repel demons.

UNESCO designated the Complex of Koguryo Tombs as a World Heritage Site. UNESCO has also put protective measures in place to preserve the tombs and their murals.

Many Goguryeo tomb paintings were created using the methods of Fresco, Tempera, and Hwajangibeop. All methods utilize limestone, but Fresco allows colored paints to survive oxidization and fading for longer periods of time. Researchers were surprised to learn of the use of Fresco in tomb paintings, as they had no previous experience finding this method utilized in the region previously. Black, purple, yellow, blue, green, and brown were common color palettes within Goguryeo tomb murals, as the murals' main purpose was to produce calmness within the tomb and ward away evil spirits. These colors were also common as soot, minerals, and glues were common base elements in paint mixes. Goethite, Hematite, and Cinnabar are examples of common paint mineral powders utilized in Goguryeo mural paintings. Unfortunately, no matter the method, lime layers have eventually fallen from the murals throughout all existing Goguryeo tombs.

Goguryeo painting also inspired the creation of similar works in other parts of East Asia, like Japan. This can be seen in the wall murals of Horyu-ji which show its Goguryeo influence. Mural painting also spread to the other two kingdoms. These murals reveal valuable clues about the Goguryeo kingdom including the importance of Buddhism, its architecture, and the clothing commonly worn at the time. In specific, clothing is well archived through Goguryeo tomb paintings. In paintings where women are performing Goguryeo-era dances, the dancers are wearing long-sleeved dancing apparel. This apparel from the paintings matches textual descriptions of Goguryeo dancewear. Goguryeo tomb paintings exist as tangible evidence of changing cultures via clothing as well. Goguryeo men in tomb paintings are often adorning Po, a traditional overcoat. When comparing the men in these paintings over time, changes in sleeve size can be noticed, indicating that the shape of the Po was changing over the course of time. Chinese influences can be noted in certain tomb mural techniques, characters’ clothing in the paintings, or through displayed Buddhist tradition. Goguryeo tomb murals thus display relationships and cultural exchanges between nearby regions. Lotus flowers, a symbol adjacent with Buddhism, were a common pattern or symbol within Goguryeo tomb paintings.

These murals were also the very beginnings of Korean landscape paintings and portraiture. However, because the tombs were easily accessed, its treasures were looted leaving very few physical artifacts. Tomb raidings additionally opened the seals of the tomb, which were not properly restored, resulting in destructive outside elements, compromised air, and above soil to damage the murals.

References:

- Ahn, Hwi-Joon, & Park, Hyun-ah. (2015). Development of Goguryeo tomb murals. The International Journal of Korean Art and Archaeology, 9, 8–31. Accessed via University of Maryland Global Campus.
- 전호태 (Jeon Ho-tae). (2004). Goguryeo Culture and Mural Paintings. The review of Korean studies, 11–33. Accessed via University of Maryland Global Campus.
- Kang, E.-S. (2006). A Study on clothing in Suhainmyuldo painted on an old tomb of ancient kingdom of Goguryeo between the 4th and late 6th century. Journal of Fashion Business, 103(3), 54-68. https://citeseerx.ist.psu.edu/document?repid=rep1&type=pdf&doi=4e8525297514da9182b2e037801d350035a3f044
- Lena, K. (Ed.). (n.d.). Koguryo Tomb Murals. International Council on Monuments and Sites Korea. https://jikimi.cha.go.kr/english/heritage_book/korguryo.pdf
- UNESCO. (n.d.). Safeguarding Koguryo Tombs & Mural Paintings in the Democratic People's Republic of Korea. https://whc.unesco.org/en/koguryotombs/

==== Baekje ====
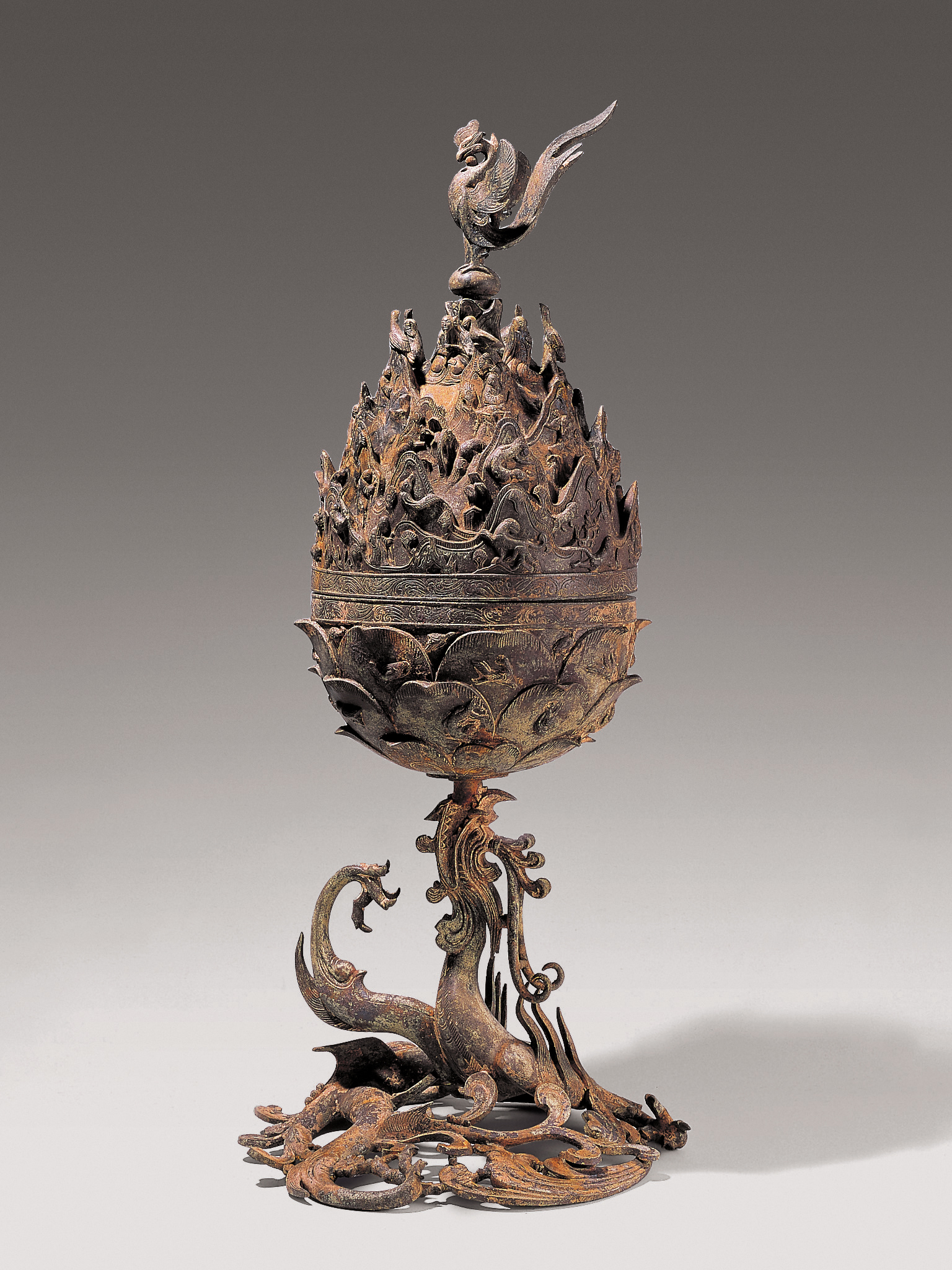
Gilt-bronze Incense Burner of Baekje

Baekje (or Paekche) is considered the kingdom with the greatest art among the three states. Baekje was a kingdom in southwestern Korea and was influenced by southern Chinese dynasties, such as the Liang dynasty. Baekje was also one of the kingdoms to introduce a significant Korean influence into the art of Japan during this time period.

Baekje Buddhist sculpture is characterized by its naturalness, warmness, and harmonious proportions exhibits a unique Korean style. Another example of Korean influence is the use of the distinctive "Baekje smile", a mysterious and unique smile that is characteristic of many Baekje statutes. While there are no surviving examples of wooden architecture, the Mireuksa site holds the foundation stones of a destroyed temple and two surviving granite pagodas that show what Baekje architecture may have looked. An example of Baekje architecture may be gleaned from Horyu-ji temple because Baekje architects and craftsmen helped design and construct the original temple.

The tomb of King Muryeong held a treasure trove of artifacts not looted by grave robbers. Among the items were flame-like gold pins, gilt-bronze shoes, gold girdles (a symbol of royalty), and swords with gold hilts with dragons and phoenixes.

==== Silla ====
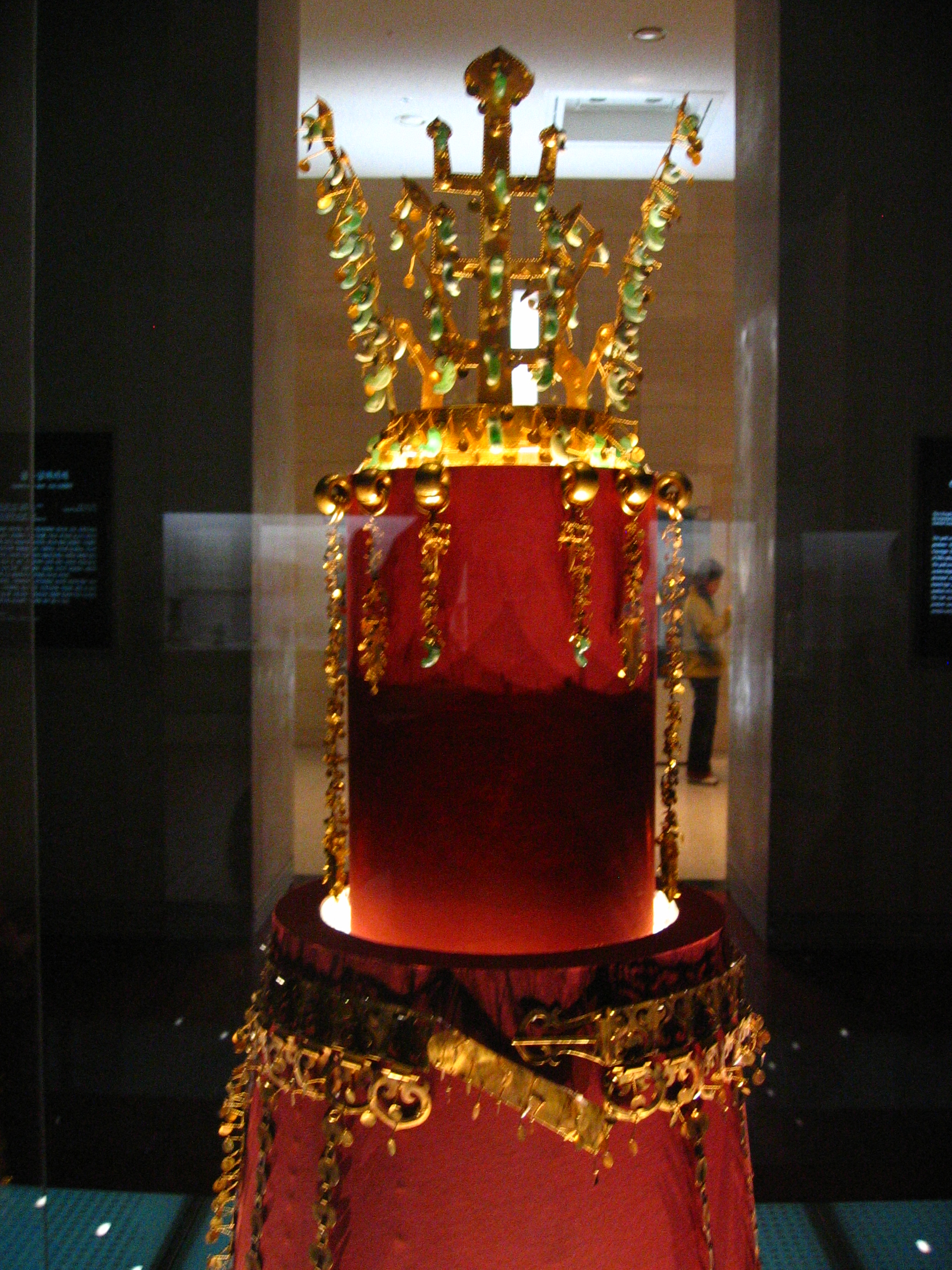
Gold Crown of Silla, late 4th - early 5th century AD

The Silla Kingdom was the most isolated kingdom from the Korean peninsula because it was situated in the southeastern part of the peninsula. Because of Silla's geographic location on the peninsula, the kingdom was the last to adopt Buddhism and foreign cultural influences into their society.

The Silla Kingdom tombs were mostly inaccessible and so many examples of Korean art came from this kingdom. The Silla craftsman were famed for their gold-crafting ability which have similarities to Etruscan and Greek techniques, as exemplified by gold earrings and crowns. Because of Silla gold artifacts bearing similarities to European techniques along with glass and beads depicting blue-eyed people found in royal tombs, many believe that the Silk Road went all the way to Korea. Most notable objects of Silla art are its gold crowns that are made from pure gold and have tree and antler-like adornments that suggest a Scythe-Siberian and Korean shamanistic tradition.

=== Gaya ===
The Gaya confederacy was a group of city-states that did not consolidate into a centralized kingdom. It shared many similarities in its art, such as crowns with tree-like protrusions which are seen in Baekje and Silla. Many of the artifacts unearthed in Gaya tumuli are artifacts related to horses, such as stirrups, saddles, and horse armor. Ironware was best plentiful in this period than any age.

=== North-South States ===
North South States Period (698–926 CE) refers to the period in Korean history when Silla and Balhae coexisted in the southern and northern part of Korea, respectively.

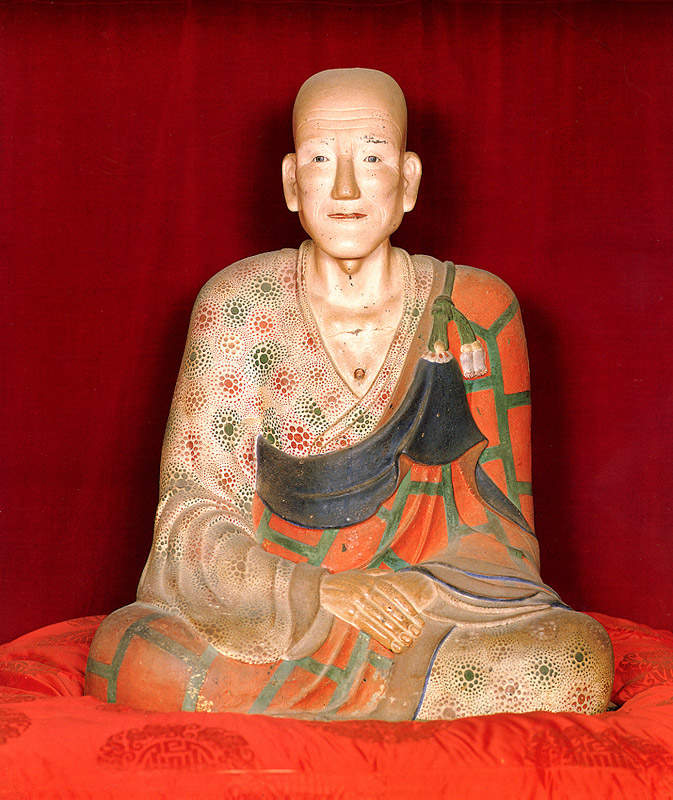
Statue of a Silla Buddhist monk, depicting Master Huirang, made around 930

==== Unified Silla ====
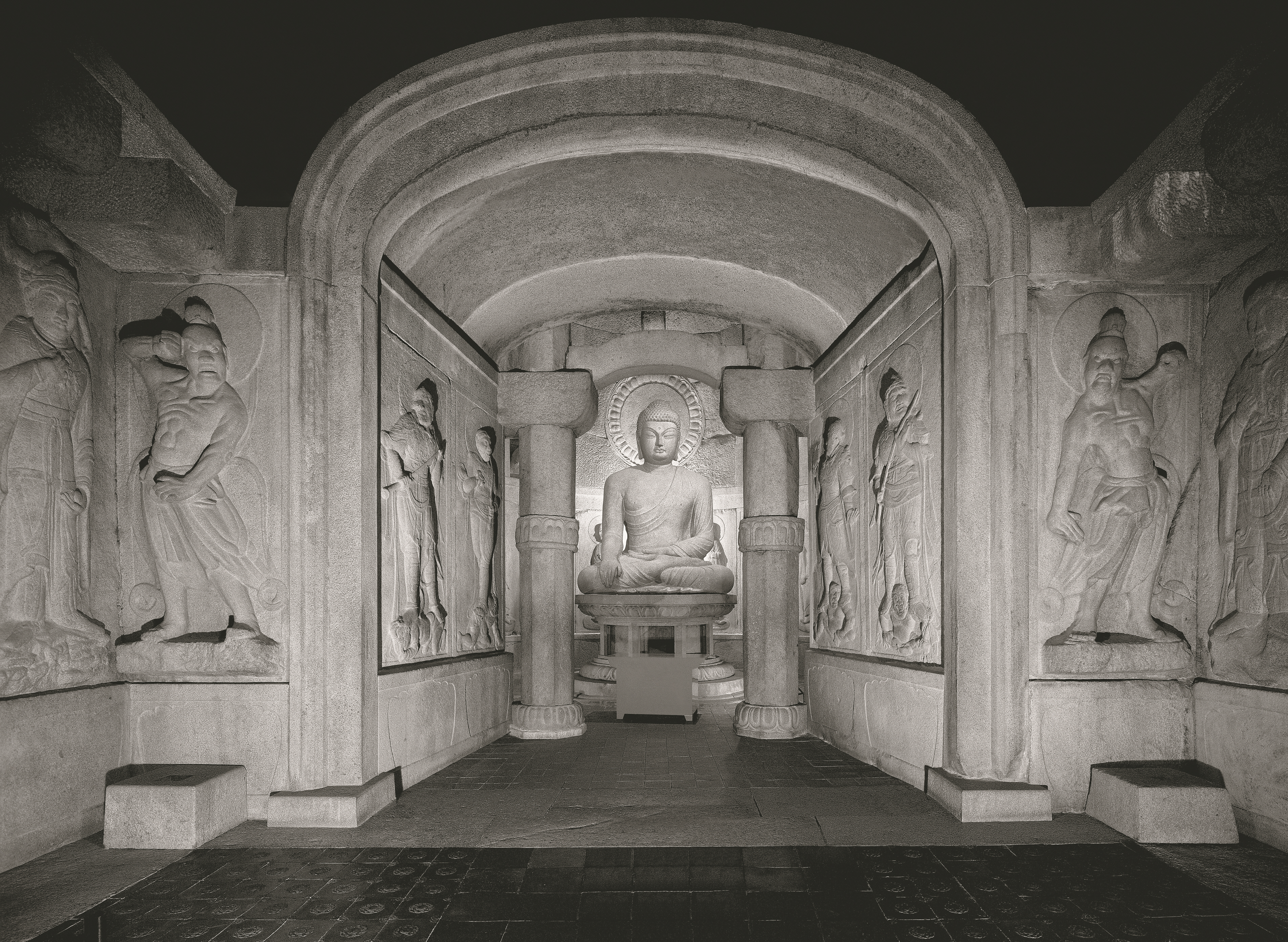
Seokguram Grotto, made in 751

Unified Silla (668–935) was a time of great artistic output in Korea, especially in Buddhist art. Examples include the Seokguram grotto and the Bulguksa temple. Two pagodas on the ground, the Seokgatap and Dabotap are also unique examples of Silla masonry and artistry. Craftsmen also created massive temple bells, reliquaries, and statutes. The capital city of Unified Silla was nicknamed the "city of gold" because of use of gold in many objects of art.

==== Balhae ====
The composite nature of the northern Korean Kingdom of Balhae (698–926) art can be found in the two tombs of Balhae Princesses. Shown are some aristocrats, warriors, and musicians and maids of the Balhae people, who are depicted in the mural painting in the Tomb of Princess Jeonghyo, a daughter of King Mun (737-793), the third monarch of the kingdom. The murals displayed the image of the Balhae people in its completeness.

The remains of ten Buddhist temples have been found in the remains of the capital of Balhae, Sanggyeong, together with such Buddhist artifacts as Buddha statuettes and stone lanterns, which suggests that Buddhism played a predominant role in the life of the Balhae people. The Balhae tomb Majeokdal in Sinpo, South Hamgyong Province, are associated with pagodas and temples: This also indicates that Buddhism had a strong influence over the funerary rituals in Balhae.

=== Goryeo dynasty ===
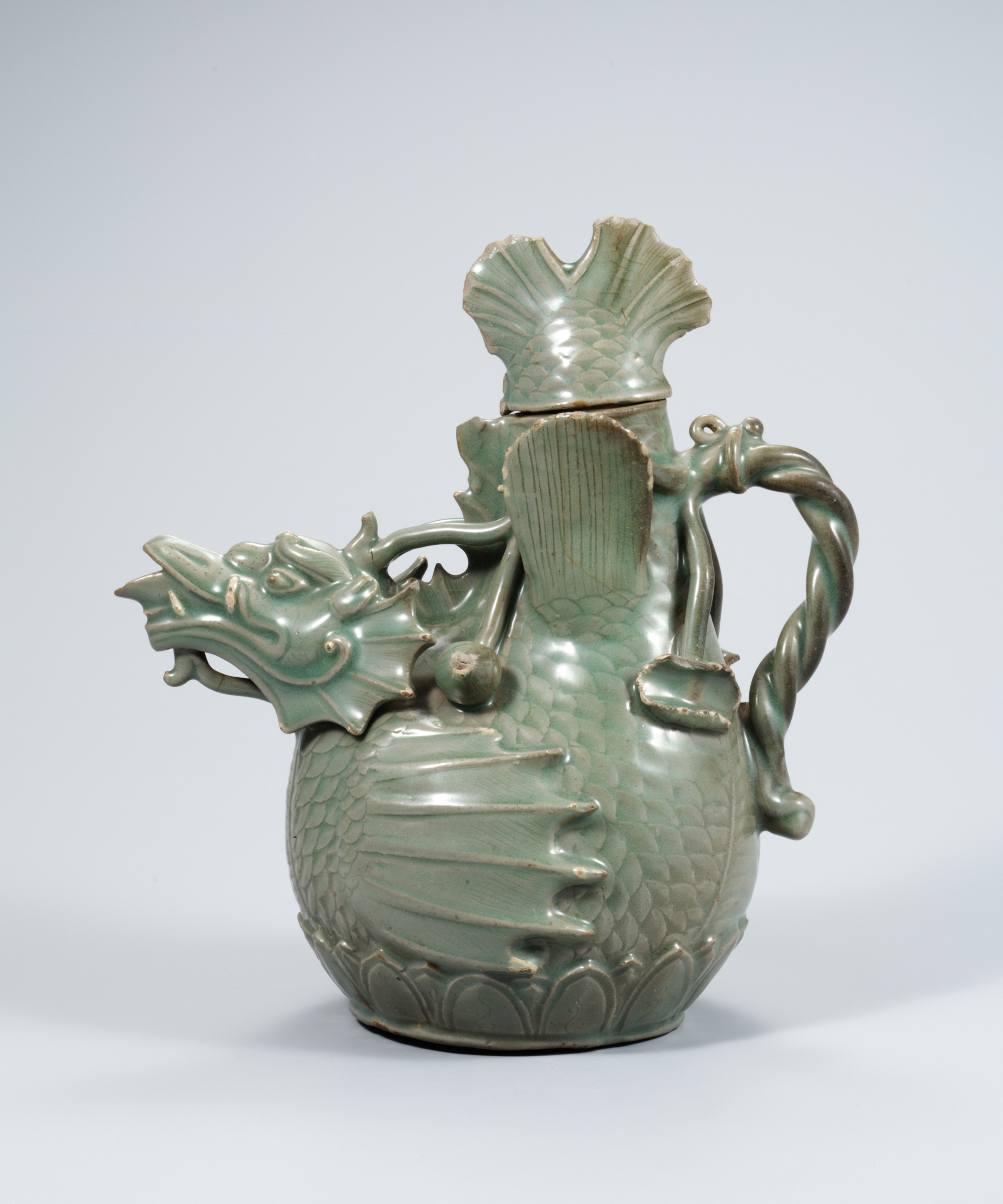
Dragon-shaped Celadon Ewer

The Goryeo dynasty lasted from 918 CE to 1392. The most famous art produced by Goryeo artisans was Korean celadon pottery which was produced from circa 1050 CE to 1250 CE. While celadon originated in China, Korean potters created their own unique style of pottery. Jinsa "underglaze red", a technique using copper oxide pigment to create copper-red designs, was developed in Korea during the 12th century, and later inspired the "underglaze red" ceramics of the Yuan dynasty.

The Korean celadon had a unique glaze known as "king-fisher" color, an iron based blue-green glaze created by reducing oxygen in the kiln. Korean celadon displayed organic shapes and free-flowing style, such as pieces that were made to look like fish, melons, and other animals. Koreans invented an inlaid technique known as sanggam, where potters would engrave semi-dried pottery with designs and place materials within the decorations with black or white clay.

During this period, the Korean craft of inlaid lacquerware, najeonchilgi, is said to have peaked. Lacquerware was densely adorned with tiny, floral shapes made of sea turtle shell and mother-of-pearl. To produce the designs on a single lacquered box, currently held at the National Palace Museum of Korea in Seoul, artisans utilized about 45,000 fragments of mother of pearl.

=== Joseon dynasty ===
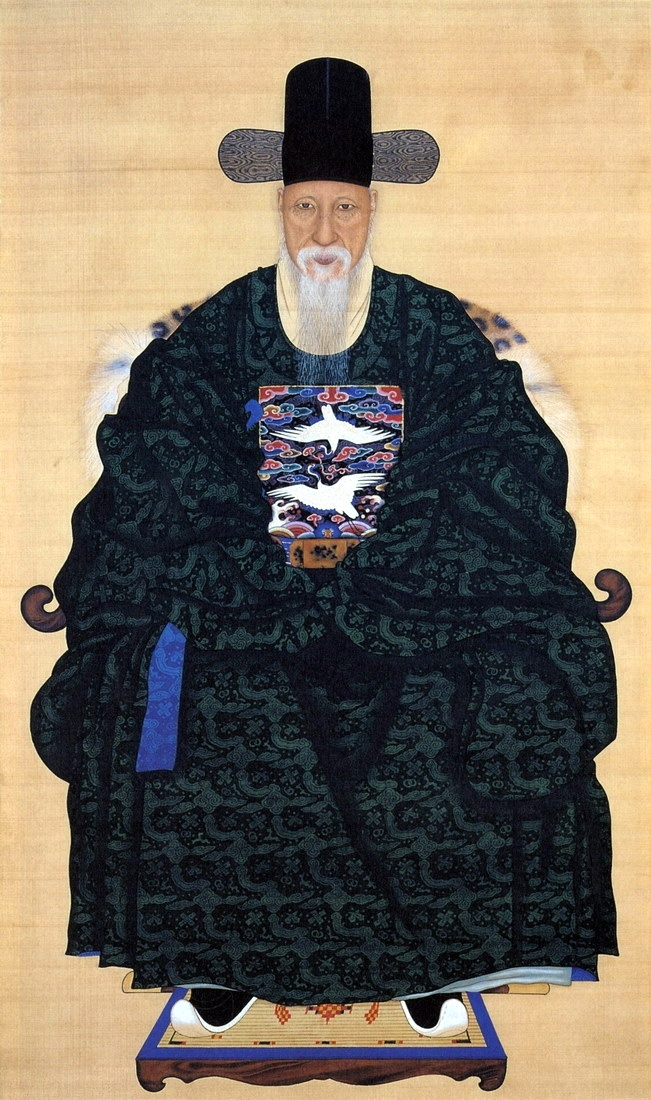
Portrait of Oh jaesun (1727–1792), painted by Yi Myeonggi (1756–?) in the late 18th century, Joseon

The influence of Confucianism superseded that of Buddhism in this period. However, Buddhist elements remained. Buddhist art did not decline, but continued and was encouraged, but not by the imperial centres of art, or the accepted taste of the Joseon dynasty publicly. However, in private homes and in the summer palaces of the Joseon dynasty kings, the simplicity of Buddhist art was given great appreciation – but it was not seen as citified art.

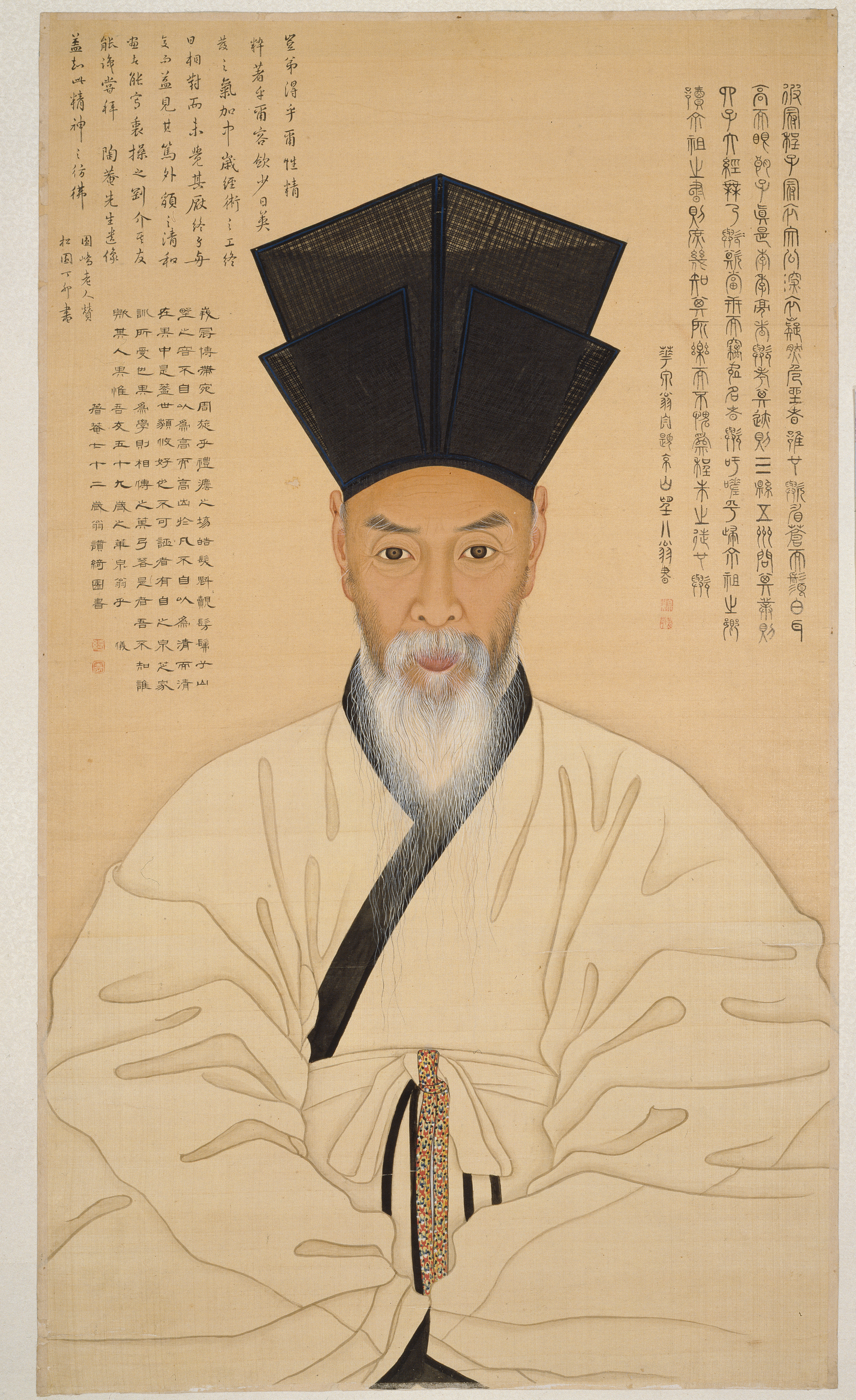
Portrait of Yi Chae (1745–1820), painted in 1802

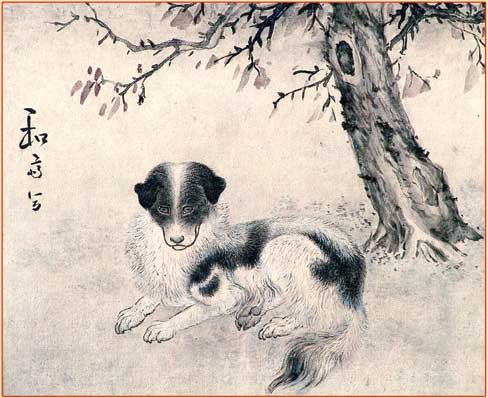
Byeon Sangbyeok (1730~?), Gyeondo (painting of a dog). 18th century, Joseon Korea.

While the Joseon dynasty began under military auspices, Goreyo styles were let to evolve, and Buddhist iconography (bamboo, orchid, plum and chrysanthemum; and the familiar knotted goodluck symbols) were still a part of genre paintings. Neither colours nor forms had any real change, and rulers stood aside from edicts on art. Ming ideals and imported techniques continued in early dynasty idealized works.

Mid-dynasty painting styles moved towards increased realism. A national painting style of landscapes called "true view" began – moving from the traditional Chinese style of idealized general landscapes to particular locations exactly rendered. While not photographic, the style was academic enough to become established and supported as a standardized style in Korean painting.

The mid- to late-Joseon dynasty is considered the golden age of Korean painting. It coincides with the shock of the collapse of Ming dynasty links with the Manchu emperors accession in China, and the forcing of Korean artists to build new artistic models based on nationalism and an inner search for particular Korean subjects. At this time China ceased to have pre-eminent influence, Korean art took its own course, and became increasingly distinctive. New genres of Korean painting flourished, such as chaekgeori (paintings of books) and munjado (paintings of letters), revealing the infatuation with books and learning in Korean culture. Korean folk art, called minhwa, also emerged during this time.

== Other visual arts ==
Korean art is characterized by transitions in the main religions at the time: early Korean shamanist art, then Korean Buddhist art and Korean Confucian art, through the various forms of Western arts in the 20th century.

Art works in metal, jade, bamboo and textiles have had a limited resurgence. The South Korean government has tried to encourage the maintenance of cultural continuity by awards, and by scholarships for younger students in rarer Korean art forms.

=== Calligraphy and printing ===
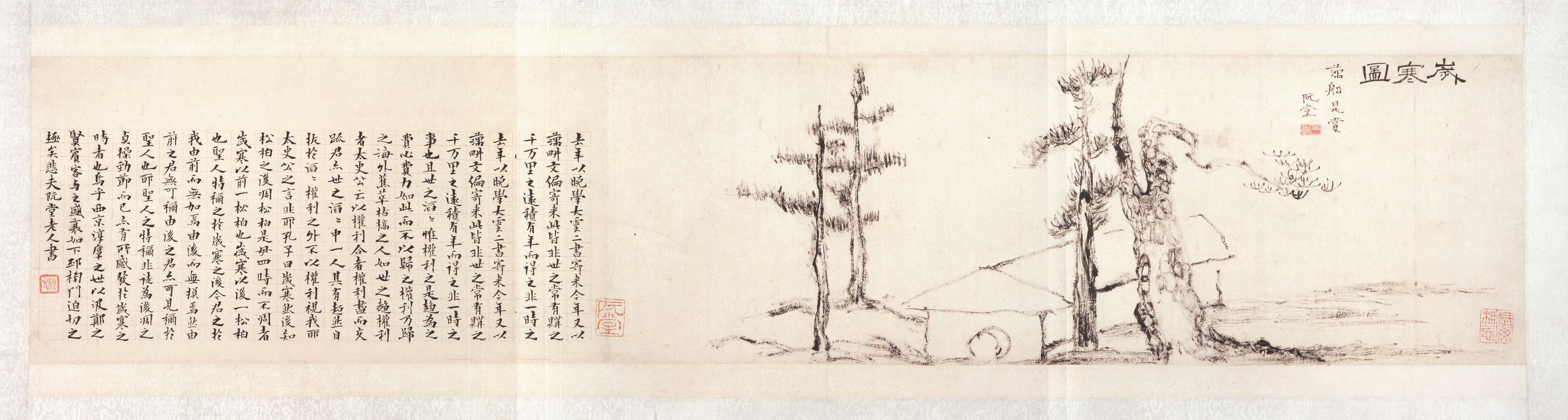
Painting in the Era of Cold Weather by Kim Jeong-hui

Korean calligraphy is seen as an art where brushstrokes reveal the artist's personality enhancing the subject matter that is painted. This art form represents the apogee of Korean Confucian art.

Korean fabric arts have a long history, and include Korean embroidery used in costumes and screenwork; Korean knots as best represented in the work of Choe Eun-sun, used in costumes and as wall-decorations; and lesser known weaving skills as indicated below in rarer arts.

Korean paper art includes all manner of handmade paper (hanji), used for architectural purposes (window screens, floor covering), for printing, artwork, and the Korean folded arts (paper fans, paper figures), and as well Korean paper clothing which has an annual fashion show in Jeonju attracting world attention.

In the 1960s, Korean paper made from mulberry roots was discovered when the Pulguksa (temple) complex in Gyeongju was remodelled. The date on the Buddhist documents converts to a western calendar date of 751, and indicated that indeed the oft quoted claim that Korean paper can last a thousand years was proved irrevocably. However, after repeated invasions, very little early Korean paper art exists. Contemporary paper artists are very active.

=== Painting ===
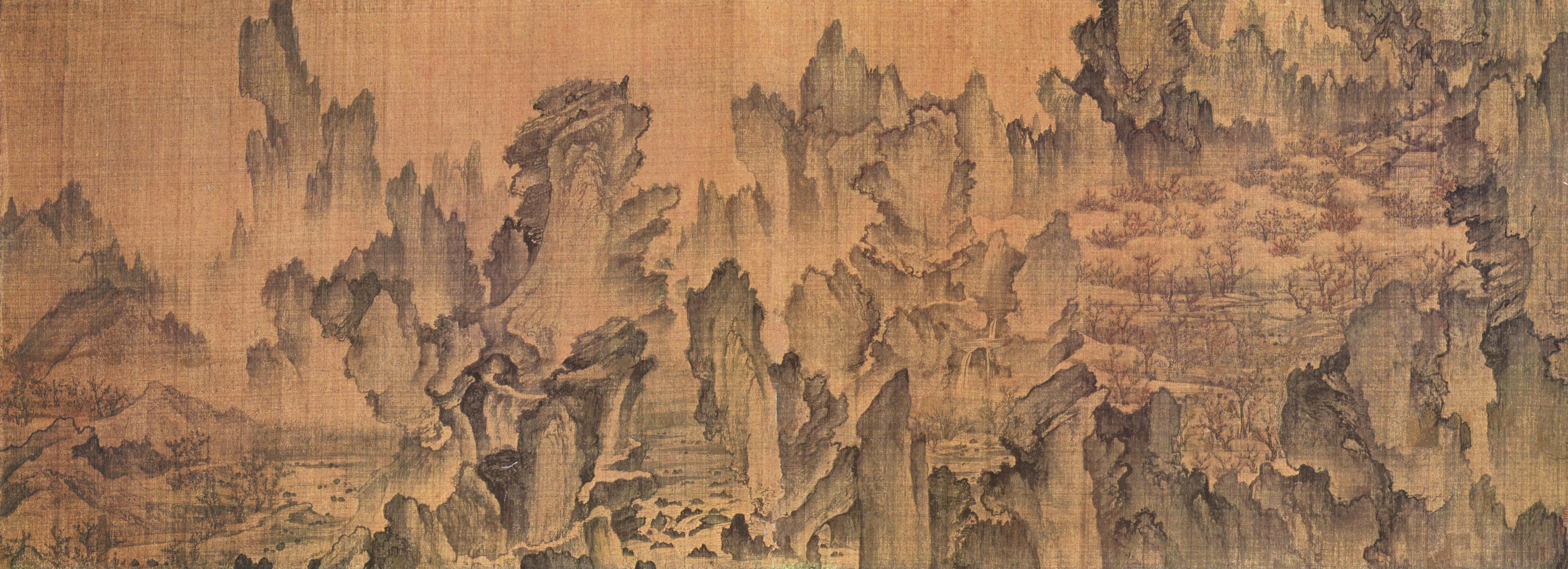
Dream Journey to the Peach Blossom Land by An Gyeon

For much of the 20th century, painting commanded precedence above other artistic media in Korea. Beginning in the 1930s, abstraction was of particular interest.

From the mid-1960s, artists like Kwon Young-woo began to push paint, soak canvas, drag pencils, rip paper, and otherwise manipulate the materials of painting in ways that challenged preconceived notions of what it meant to be an ink painter (Asian painter) or oil painter (soyanghwaga), the two categories within which most artists were categorized. In the 1970s and 80, these challenges eventually became the foundation of Dansaekhwa, or Korean monochrome painting, one of the most successful and controversial artistic movements in twentieth-century Korea. Literally meaning "monochrome painting," the works of artists like Ha Chonghyun, Park Seo-bo, Lee Ufan, Yun Hyong Keun, Choi Myoung-young, Kim Guiline and Lee Dong-youb were promoted in Seoul, Tokyo, and Paris. Tansaekhwa grew to be the international face of contemporary Korean art and a cornerstone of contemporary Asian art.

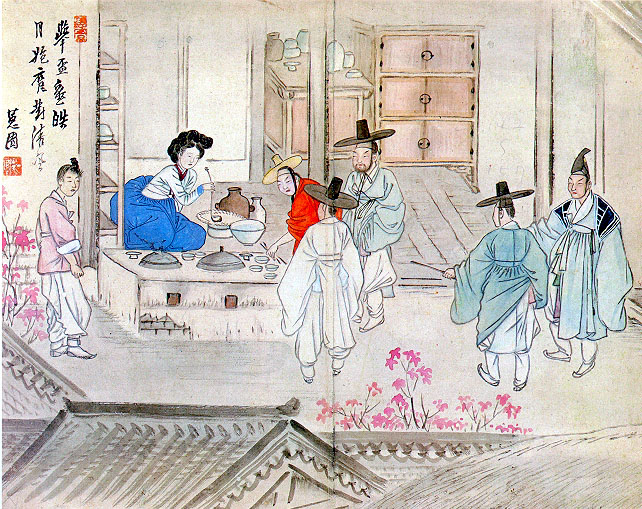
Holding a drinking bout by Sin Yun-bok

Abstract painting techniques around this time were influenced by Japanese and European developments in painting. Academic painting inspired by Japanese modernism was favored by the Park Chung-hee dictatorship and shown in state-run shows called Gukjeon (National Art Exhibition). The government's favoritism towards apolitical painting and censorship of political art sparked backlash from younger artists at the time who then created experimental art collectives in direct resistance to these developments in painting.

Some contemporary Korean painting demands an understanding of Korean ceramics and Korean pottery as the glazes used in these works and the textures of the glazes make Korean art more in the tradition of ceramic art, than of western painterly traditions, even if the subjects appear to be of western origin. Brush-strokes as well are far more important than they are to the western artist; paintings are judged on brush-strokes more often than pure technique.

The contemporary artist Suh Yongsun, who is highly appreciated and was elected "Korea's artist of the year 2009", makes paintings with heavy brushstrokes and shows topics like both Korean history and urban scenes especially of Western cities like New York and Berlin. His artwork is an example of the combination of Korean and Western subjects and painting styles.

landscape byeongpung by Jangdeok

Other Korean artists combining modern Western and Korean painting traditions are i.e. Junggeun Oh and Tschoon Su Kim.

While there have been only rare studies on Korean aesthetics, a useful place to begin for understanding how Korean art developed an aesthetic is in Korean philosophy, and related articles on Korean Buddhism, and Korean Confucianism.

=== North Korea ===
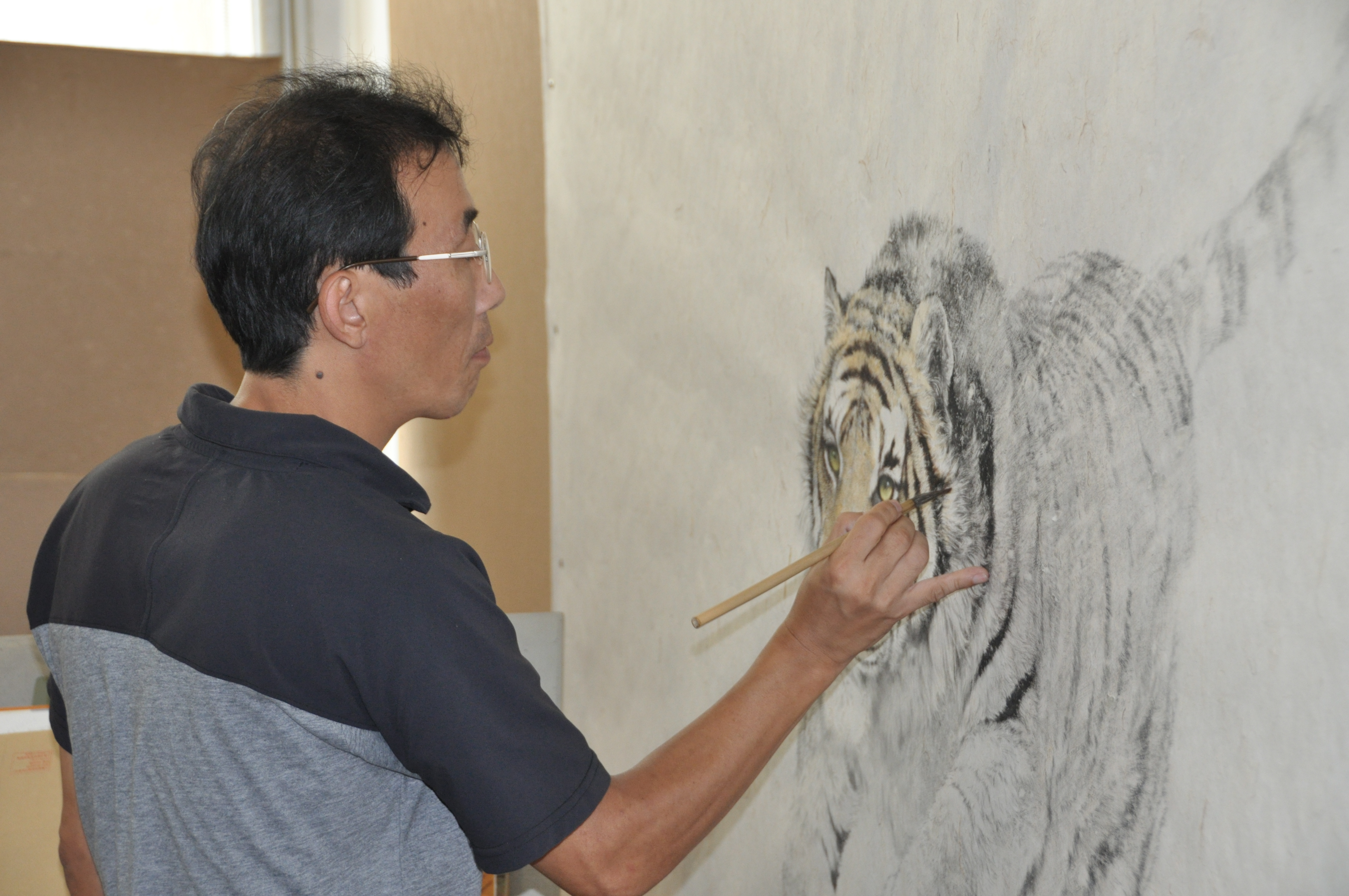
An artist of the Mansudae Art Studio paints. The particularities of North Korean communism have reinvigorated old subjects and techniques with a nationalist dimension.

During Kim Il Sung's rule, painting was allowed only in the socialist realist genre and propaganda posters were the stock of North Korean visual arts. After Kim Il Sung's death in 1994, directives on painting were relaxed and sometimes completely abolished under Kim Jong Il. New art forms, including a kind of impressionism peculiar to North Korea, rose to complement posters.

Art forms other than socialist realism are particularly seen in the patriotic films that dominated that culture from 1949 to 1994, and the reawakened architecture, calligraphy, fabric work and neo-traditional painting, that has occurred from 1994 to date.

The impact was greatest on revolutionary posters, lithography and multiples, dramatic and documentary film, realistic painting, grand architecture, and least in areas of domestic pottery, ceramics, exportable needlework, and the visual crafts. Sports art and politically charged revolutionary posters have been the most sophisticated and internationally collectible by auction houses and specialty collectors. North Korean painters who escaped to the United States in the late 1950s include the Fwhang sisters. Duk Soon Fwhang and Chung Soon Fwhang O'Dwyer avoid overtly political statements in favor of tempestuous landscapes, bridging Western and Far Eastern painting techniques. North Korean painters are renowned for their skill, and those who manage to defect to South Korea are regularly employed as artists there.

== Ceramics and sculpture ==
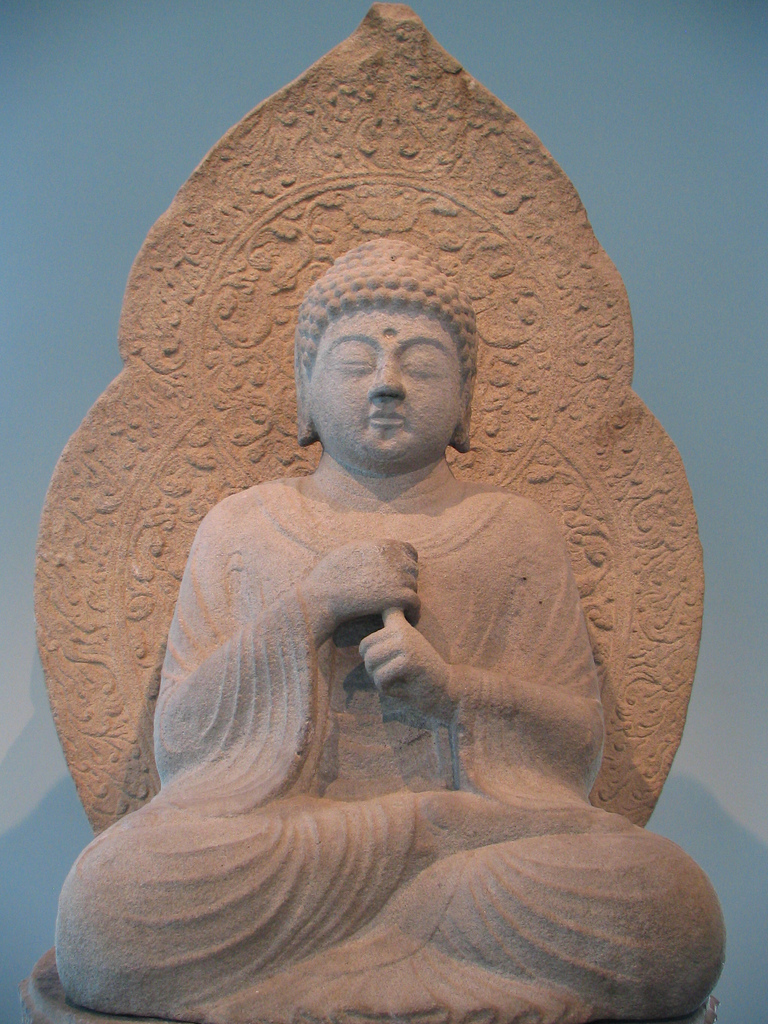
A Buddhist sculpture from the Silla period, 9th century AD

The remains of early Korean pottery can be found predominantly in Gangjin. Gangjin was one of the main producers of ancient Korean pottery.

Korean pottery is typically divided into three different categories: Cheongja (blue-green celadon), Baekja (white porcelain) and Buncheong (slip-coated stoneware).

See: Korean pottery and porcelains and Korean Celadon

=== Ancient Sculpture ===
Korean sculpture was exported, primarily during the Baekje period, to Japan, where Korean Buddhist sculptures from the seventh century still exist. Main Korean sculptures were generally made of wood, then later stone, and then ceramic, with votive sculptures being the greatest in number. Smaller sculptures were also made using jade, gold and other metals. The greatest Korean sculptures were produced in the time of Korean Buddhist art.

=== Modern sculpture ===
An example is Greetingman by Yoo Young-ho.

=== Korean ceramic artists and sculptors ===
- Yu Geun-Hyeong
- Kim Yik Yung
- Um Tai-Jung
- Cho Ki-Jung
- Yoon Kwang cho
- Kim Se-yong
- Shin Sang Ho

References:

- Korean Ceramics Today. Korea-Britain Centennial Committee, 1983
- Contemporary Korean Ceramics: Survey of Current Works. Grossmont College, 1993
- From the Fire: A survey of contemporary Korean ceramics. International Arts & Artists, 2004

=== Cheongja (청자) ===
Céladon is a type of pottery is characterized by its jade blue surface and its inlay technique.

See: Goryeo ware

=== Baekja (백자) ===
100–600 years ago, white porcelain ware was the main representation of Korean ceramic. Baekja is type of pottery characterized in various ways; the main feature was its milky white surface. Many were decorated with a variety of painted designs using oxidized iron, copper, or cobalt blue pigments imported from Persia via China.

See: Joseon white porcelain

=== Buncheong (분청) ===
These pieces were made by Goryeo potters after the fall of their kingdom in 1392. It is mainly identified through its slip-coated surface and simple ornamental designs.

See: Buncheong

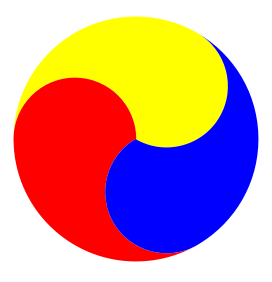
Tricolored Taegeuk

== Architecture and interior design ==
There is a long tradition of Korean gardens, often linked with palaces.

Patterns often have their origins in early ideographs. Geometric patterns and patterns of plant, animal and nature motifs are the four most basic patterns. Geometric patterns include triangles, squares, diamonds, zigzags, latticework, frets, spirals sawteeth, circles, ovals and concentric circles. Stone Age rock carvings feature animal designs in order to relate to food-gathering activities. These patterns are found doors of temples and shrines, clothes, furniture and daily objects such as fans and spoons.

== Performing arts ==
In the performing arts, Korean storytelling is done in both ritualistic shamanistic ways, in the songs of yangban scholars, and the crossovers between the visual arts and the performing arts, which are more intense and fluid than in the West.

Depicted on petroglyphs and in pottery shards, as well as wall paintings in tombs, the various performing arts nearly always incorporated Korean masks, costumes with Korean knots, Korean embroidery, and a dense overlay of art in combination with other arts.

Some specific dances are considered important cultural heritage pieces of art. The performing arts have always been linked to the fabric arts: not just in costumery but in woven screens behind the plays, ornaments woven or embroidered or knotted to indicate rank, position, or as shamanistic charms; and in other forms to be indicated.

Historically, the division of the performing arts is between arts done almost exclusively by women in costume, danceworks, and those done exclusively by men in costume, storytelling. Those done as a group by both sexes with women's numbers in performances reduced as time goes on as it became reputable for men to function as public entertainers.

=== Tea ceremony ===
The Korean tea ceremony is held in a Korean tea house with characteristic architecture, often within Korean gardens and served in a way with ritualized conversation, formal poetry on wall-scrolls, and with Korean pottery and traditional Korean costumes, the environment itself is a series of naturally flowing events that provide a cultural and artistic experience.

=== Musical arts and theatre ===
The skill of contemporary Korean performing artists, who have had great recognition abroad, particularly in stringed instruments and as symphony directors, or operatic sopranos and mezzos, takes part in a long musical history.

Korean music in contemporary times is generally divided into the same audiences as the west: with the same kind of audiences for music based on age, and city (classical, pop, techno, house, hip-hop, jazz; traditional) and provincial divisions (folk, country, traditional, classical, rock). World music influences are very strong provincially, with traditional musical instruments once more gaining ground. Competition with China for tourists has forced a much larger attention to traditional Korean musical forms in order to differentiate itself from the west, and east.

The new Seoul Opera house, which will be the anchor for Korean opera has just been allowed to be built, is set for a $300 million home on an island on the Han river. Korean opera and an entirely redeveloped western opera season, and opera school, to compete with the Beijing opera house, and Japan's historical centre for western operas in the far east is the present focus.

Korean court music has a history going back to the Silla where Tang court music was played; later Song dynasty inspired "A-ak" a Korean version played on Chinese instruments within the Joseon era. Recreations of this music are done in Seoul primarily under the auspices of the Korea Foundation and The National Center for Korean Traditional Performing Arts (NCKTPA).

Court musicians appear in traditional costume, maintain a rigid proper formal posture, and play stringed five-stringed instruments. Teaching by this the "yeak sasang" principles of Confucianism, perfection of tone and acoustic space is put ahead of coarse emotionality. Famous works of court music include: jongmyo jeryeak, designated a UNESCO world cultural heritage, Cheoyongmu, Taepyeongmu, and Sujecheon.

Korean folk music or pansori is the base from which most new music originates being strongly simple and rhythmic.

Korean musicals are a recent innovation, encouraged by the success of Broadway revivals, like Showboat, recent productions such as the musical based on Queen Min have toured globally. There are precedents for popular musical dance-dramas in gamuguk popular in Goryeo times, with some 21st-century concert revivals.

Korean stage set design again has a long history and has always drawn inspiration from landscapes, beginning with outdoor theatre, and replicating this by the use of screens within court and temple stagings of rituals and plays. There are few if any books on this potentially interesting area. A rule of thumb has been that the designs have much open space, more two-dimensional space, and subdued tone and colour, and been done by artists to evoke traditional brush painting subjects. Modern plays have tended towards western scenic flats, or minimalist atonality to force a greater attention on the actors. Stage lighting still has to catch up to western standards, and does not reflect a photographer's approach to painting in colour and light, quite surprisingly.

Korean masks are generally used in shamanistic performances that have increasingly been secularized as folkart dramas. At the same time the masks themselves have become tourist artefacts post 1945, and reproduced in large numbers as souvenirs.

=== Storytelling and comedy ===
Narrative storytelling, either in poetic dramatic song by yangban scholars, or in rough-housing by physical comedians, is generally a male performance. There is as yet virtually no stand-up comedy in Korea because of cultural restrictions on insult-humour, personal comments, and respect for seniors, despite globally successful Korean comic films which depend on comedy of error, and situations with no apparent easy resolution under tight social restraints.

Korean oral history includes: narrative myths, legends, folk tales; songs, folksongs, shaman songs and p'ansori (traditional Korean narrative song initially created to entertain commoners); proverbs that expand into short historical tales, riddles, and suspicious words which have their own stories. These stories have a heavy base in Confucian, Buddhist, and Shamanistic idealism that help shape the cultural values in society that they want to pass down to future generations. They have been studied by Cho Dong-Il; Choi In-hak, and Zong In-sop, and many others who also helped contribute publications (often in English editions) for foreigners or for the teaching adolescent children.

=== Dance ===
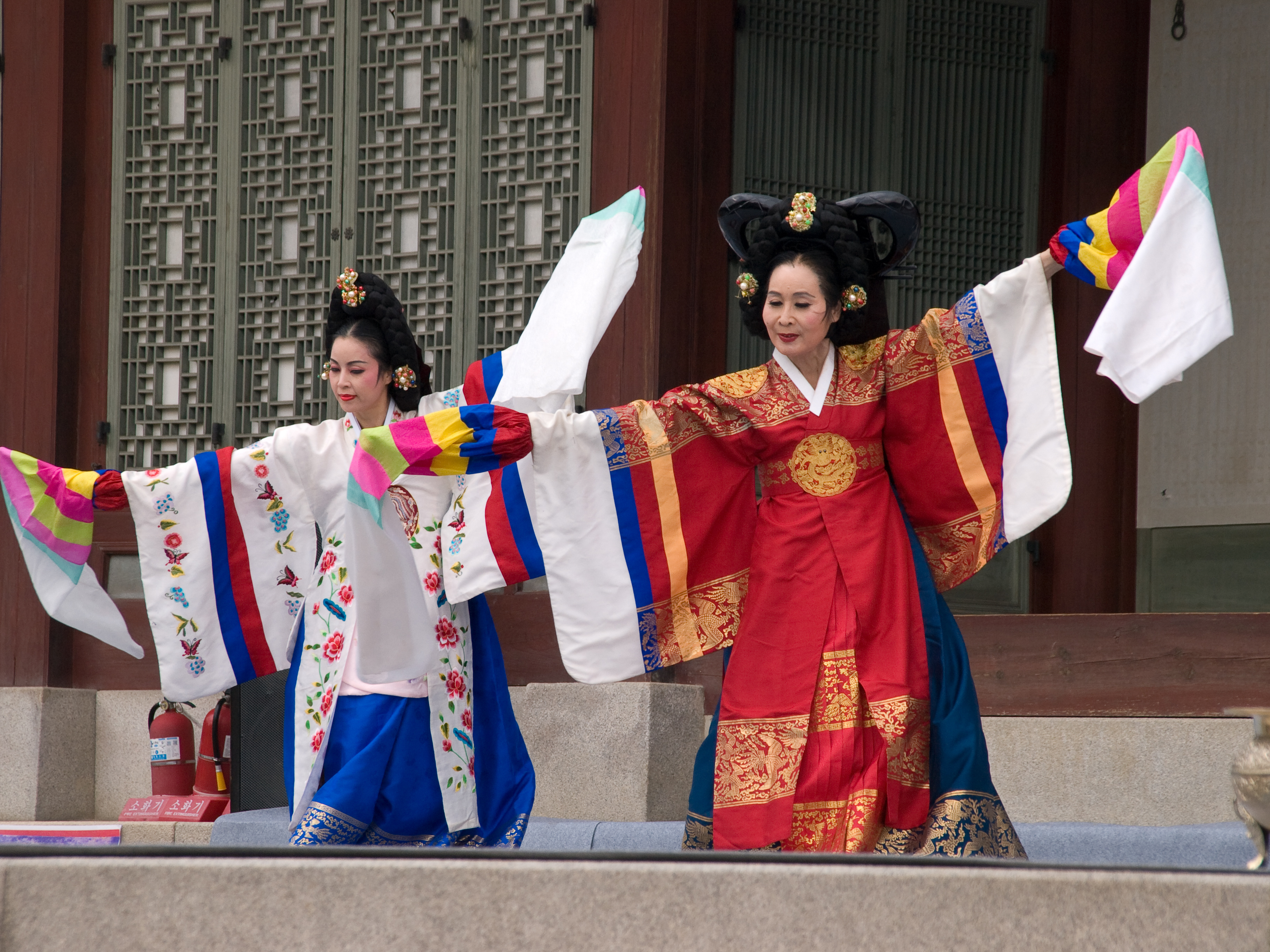
Taepyeongmu (태평무), a Korean royal court dance

Dance is a significant element of traditional Korean culture. Special traditional dances are performed as part of many annual festivals and celebrations (harvest, etc.), involving traditional costumes, specific colors, music, songs and special instruments. Some dances are performed by either men only or women only, while others are performed by both. The women usually have their hair pulled back away from the face in a bun, or may be wearing colorful hats. Some variation of the traditional hanbok is typically worn, or a special costume specific to that dance. In some dances, the women's costumes will have very long sleeves, or trail a long length of fabric, to accentuate graceful arm movements. Outdoor festivals are loud and joyous, and cymbals and drums can prominently be heard. Masks may be worn.

== Literature ==
Notable examples of historical records are very well documented from early times, and as well Korean books with moveable type, often imperial encyclopaedias or historical records, were circulated as early as the 7th century during the Three Kingdoms era from printing wood-blocks; and in the Goryeo era the world's first metal type, and books printed by metal type were produced.

Genres include epics, poetry, religious texts and exegetical commentaries on Buddhist and Confucianist learning; translations of foreign works; plays and court rituals; comedies, tragedies, mixed genres; and various kinds of novels.

=== Poetry ===
Korean poetry began to flourish in the Three Kingdoms period. Collections were repeatedly printed. With the rise of Joseon nationalism, poetry developed increasingly so and reached its apex in the late 18th century. There were attempts at introducing imagist and modern poetry methods in the early 20th century, and in the early republic period, patriotic works were very successful. Lyrical poetry dominated from the 1970s onwards.

== Universities to Study Art ==
1. Korea National University of Arts
2. Seoul National University (SNU)
3. Hanyang University
4. Yonsei University
5. Korea University
6. Sungkyunkwan University

== See also ==
- Culture of Korea
- History of Eastern art
- Korean architecture
- Korean painting
- Korean pottery
- Korean sculpture
- Korean influence on Japanese art
- Category:South Korean contemporary artists
