= Um (Korean surname) =

- Hangul: 엄
- Hanja: 嚴
- RR: Eom
- MR: Ŏm

Um (Korean: 엄), also spelled as Uhm, Eom, Eum, Ohm or Om, is a relatively uncommon surname in Korea. It is written using the same character as the Chinese surname, Yan (嚴). It has only one clan, the Yeongwol Eom clan, based in Yeongwol, Gangwon Province. According to the 2015 census in South Korea, there were 144,425 people carrying the Eom surname.

== History ==
Eom is a surname that originated from China. The founding ancestor, Eom Im-ui (hangul: 엄림의; hanja: 嚴林義), was sent to Korea by Emperor Xuanzong of Tang, during Gyeongdeok of Silla's reign. He was said to be a descendant of the Han dynasty scholar, Yan Ziling (嚴子陵), known as Eom Ja-neung in Korean (엄자능).

A member of the Eom family, Gwi-in Eom, became one of the royal consorts of King Seongjong of Joseon, but was later murdered by his successor, King Yeonsangun. Another member of this family became the consort of King Gojong, becoming the mother of the last crown prince of the Korean Empire, Yi Un.

== List of notable people ==
=== Um ===
- Um Aing-ran (born 1936), South Korean actress
- Um Cheon-ho (born 1992), South Korean short track speed skater
- Um Da-woon (born 1985), South Korean footballer
- Um Hong-gil (born 1960), South Korean climber
- Um Hyo-sup (born 1966), South Korean actor
- Um Ji-eun (born 1987), South Korean freestyle wrestler
- Um Ki-joon (born 1976), South Korean actor
- Um Min-ji (born 1991), South Korean curler
- Um Sang-back (born 1996), South Korean baseball player
- Um Sang-hyun (born 1971), South Korean voice actor
- Um Tae-hwa (born 1980), South Korean film director and screenwriter
- Um Tai-Jung (born 1938), South Korean representative first-generation abstract sculptor
- Um Won-sang (born 1999), South Korean footballer
- Um Young-sup (born 1964), South Korean former cyclist

=== Uhm ===
- Uhm Bok-dong (1892–1951), Korean cyclist
- Uhm Hong-sik (stage name Yoo Ah-in, born 1986), South Korean actor, creative director, gallerist
- Uhm Hyun-kyung (born 1986), South Korean actress
- Uhm Ji-won (born 1977), South Korean actress
- Uhm Jung-hwa (born 1969), South Korean singer and actress
- Uhm Jung-woo (born 1999), South Korean singer
- Uhm Tae-goo (born 1983), South Korean actor
- Uhm Tae-woong (born 1974), South Korean actor

=== Eom ===
- Dae-Ho Eom (born 1972), South Korean musician, philosopher, composer
- Eom Do-hyun (born 2003), South Korean artistic gymnast
- Chang-beom Eom, South Korean materials scientist
- Nami Hayakawa (born Eom Hye-rang, 1984), Japanese archer
- Ren Hayakawa (born Eom Hye-ryeon, 1987), Japanese archer, Olympic bronze medalist
- Eom Hye-won (born 1991), South Korean badminton player
- Eom Hyeon-jeong (born 1970), South Korean voice actress
- Eom Hyo-won (born 1986), South Korean handball player
- Eom In-yeong (born 1971), South Korean cyclist
- Eom Ji-sung (born 2002), South Korean footballer
- Eom Jin-han (born 1964), South Korean wrestler
- Eom Par-yong (1931–1995), South Korean sprinter
- Eom Su-yeon (born 2001), South Korean ice hockey player
- Eom Seong-Hyeon (born 2009), South Korean idol
- Eom Won-tae (born 1955), South Korean poet
- Eom Yeong-seop (born 1964), South Korean cyclist

=== Om ===
- Om Jong-ran (born 1985), North Korean footballer
- Om Yun-chol (born 1991), North Korean weightlifter

=== Ohm ===
- Ohm Ki-young (born 1951), South Korean popular news anchor

=== Oum ===
- Oum Sang-il (born 1976), South Korean mathematician

== See also ==
- List of Korean family names
