= Ki-jung =

- Hangul: 기정
- RR: Gijeong
- MR: Kijŏng
- IPA: [kid͡ʑʌŋ]

Ki-jung, also spelled Kee-chung, Ki-jeong, or Gi-jung, is a Korean given name.

People with this name include:

- Sohn Kee-chung (1914–2002), Korean Olympic marathon runner of the Japanese colonial period, later a South Korean coach
- Cho Ki-jung (1939–2007), South Korean potter
- Park Ki-jung (born 1970), South Korean sprint canoer
- Kim Gi-jung (born 1990), South Korean badminton player
- Lee Ki-jeong (born 1995), South Korean curler

== See also ==
- Kim Ki-jung (김기중; born 2001), South Korean singer, member of boy bands IM and UNB
- List of Korean given names
