= Ilmin Museum of Art =

Coordinates: 37.5699°N 126.9775°E

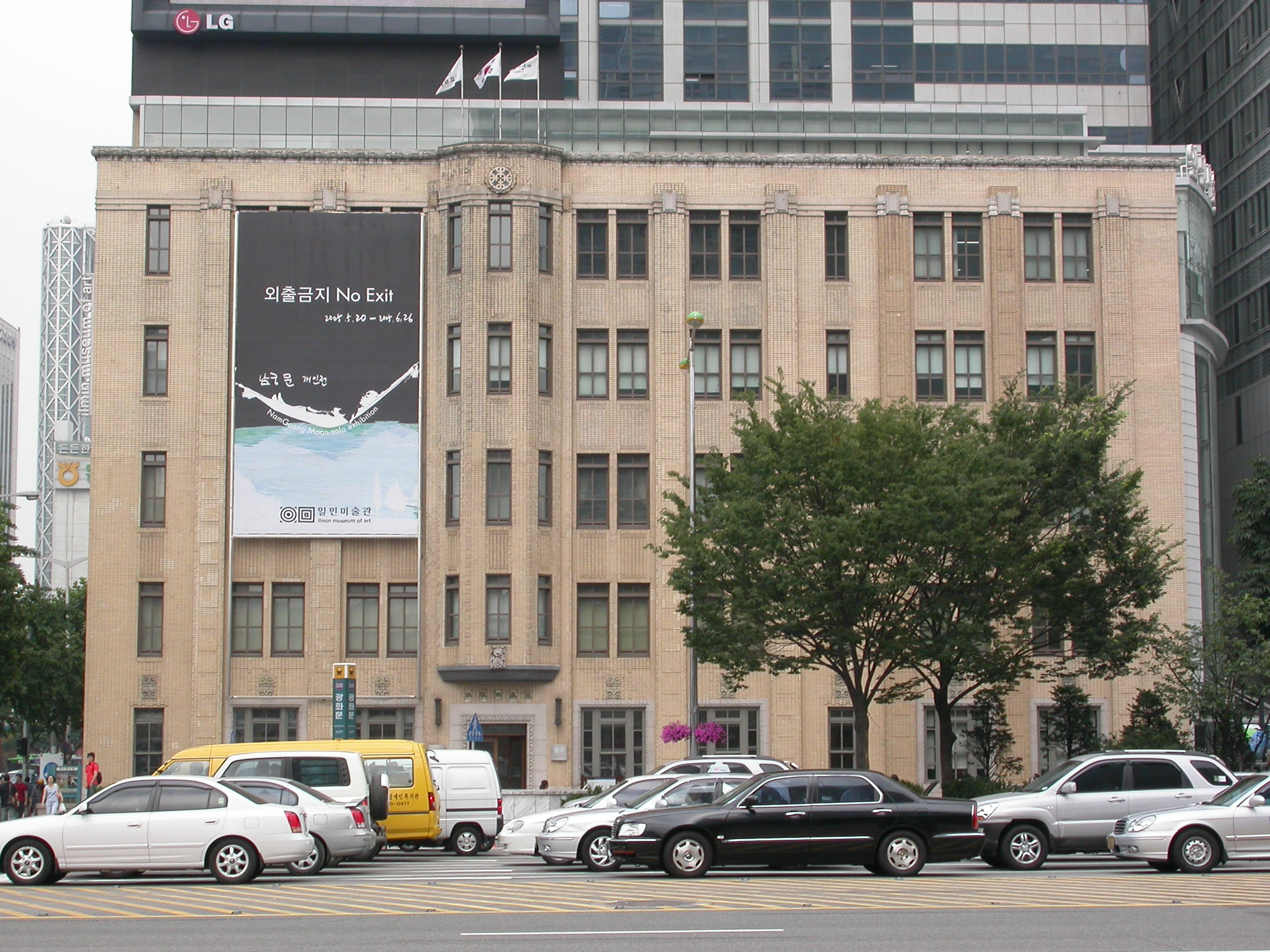
- Established: December, 1996
- Location: 139 Sejongno, Jongno District, Seoul, South Korea
- Type: art museum
- Collection size: 1730 artifacts and 250 films 650 m^{2} (7,000 sq ft)
- Website: ilmin.org

Korean name
- Hangul: 일민미술관
- Hanja: 一民美術館
- Revised Romanization: Ilmin Misulgwan
- McCune–Reischauer: Ilmin Misulgwan

Ilmin Museum of Art is a private art museum of South Korea, located on Sejongno street in Jongno District, a central district of Seoul, known for exhibiting mainly Korean art. The museum was established and run by the Ilmin Cultural Foundation (일민문화재단), a non-profit organization founded in 1994 in memory of Kim Sang-man (1910–1994), former president of The Dong-A Ilbo, one of the major newspaper companies of South Korea. Kim devoted his entire life to developing Korean journalism and promoting Korean culture. The museum is named after his art name, "Ilmin" (일민; 一民; lit. 'one people').

In December 1996, the museum opened as Ilmin Art Hall with 3 exhibition rooms in Dong-a Ilbo's previous location, built in 1926. The museum is based on the art collection of Ilmin acquired during his time. After undergoing a one-year renovation, the museum reopened in February 2002. The building has five stories and the 650 m^{2} facility. Ilmin Museum of Art also runs the only documentary archive of South Korea.

== Location ==
The Ilmin Museum of Art is situated at 139 Sejongno (Sejong Avenue) in Jongno District, the center of political, economic, cultural and artistic life of Korea since the Joseon period when Seoul was established as the capital city. Representative examples of Joseon period architecture which has remained in place near the museum include Gyeongbokgung, Deoksugung, and Gwanghwamun. Current governmental and embassy buildings, and major museums and galleries like Seoul City Hall, Ministry of Culture and Tourism and Sejong Center are also near the museum. In addition, the Ilmin Museum of Art is located on Sejongno alongside the Dong-a Media Center which is the current building for Dong-a Ilbo and hosts Presseum, South Korea's first newspaper museum. It is served by Seoul Subway's City Hall Station on Line 1 and Line 2 and Gwanghwamun Station on Line 5. The museum is within 5 minutes walking distance from the subway stations.

== Building and venues ==
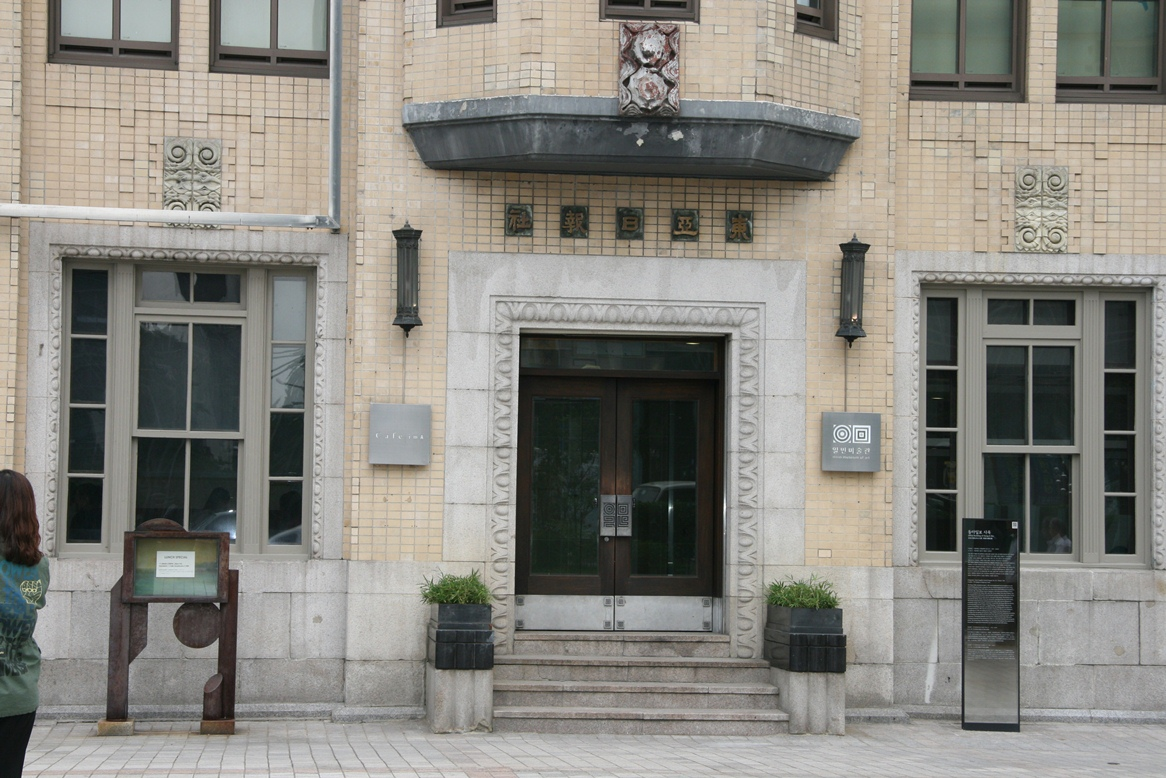
Ilmin Museum of Art entrance in 2012

The building is located at the southern end of Gwanghwamun Plaza on Sejong-ro in Jung District, the Ilmin Museum of Art, like the Seoul Museum of Art, has preserved the appearance of the old building that distinguishes it visually from the neighboring tall, modern buildings in the urban area. The five-story brown stone building is the former Dong-a Ilbo newspaper building, and is the oldest press building in Korea.

The museum consists of two large exhibition halls and Ilmin collections. On the first and second floors special exhibitions are mainly held and on the third floor, viewers can view art works of the Ilmin Collection once possessed by Kim Sang-man. The Ilmin Collection contains over 430 art pieces, consisting of Korean porcelains, paintings and calligraphy from the Goryeo and Joseon dynasty. The collection entrusted by Dong-a Ilbo houses over 1200 paintings and illustrations published in the newspaper and magazines such as Dong-a Ilbo, Shin Dong-a (신동아) and Women Dong-a (여성동아). The museum also possesses a contemporary art collection consisting of 100 art works with social messages, showing the Ilmin Museum of Art's function as a museum of contemporary art. The museum introduces contemporary art to the public through various media including painting, photography, video art and installation art.

Since the 2002 renovation, the Ilmin Museum of Art has run the only documentary archive in South Korea consisting of documentary films and video art which exhibits its collection to the public. The documentary archive is situated on the fourth floor where, with a reservation, visitors can view high quality documentary films and video art. The collection currently consists of 200 documentary films and 50 pieces of video art made by South Korean or international artists.

The museum also runs a popular cafe named iMA on the first floor where people can enjoy American style brunch and waffle.

== Activities ==
The Ilmin Museum of Art publishes Ilmin Visual Culture (일민시각문화) on visual art theories. The Ilmin Museum of Art also presents the Ilmin Art Award (일민문화상) and the Ilmin Fellowship to support artistic and cultural professionals, and academic research. Notable recipients of Ilmin Art Award include pianist-conductor Myung-Whun Chung, film director Im Kwon-taek and Yoon Hojin (윤호진), director of the musical, Empress Myeongseong.

== See also ==
- Presseum, newspaper museum founded by The Dong-A Ilbo
- Korean art
- List of museums in Seoul
- List of museums in South Korea
