= Byeongpung =

Korean traditional folding screens

Byeongpung (Korean: 병풍) are Korean folding screens made from several joined panels, bearing decorative painting and calligraphy, used to separate interiors and enclose private spaces, among other uses. It has been used for a variety of purposes, including preventing drafts, displaying paintings, displaying calligraphy, and separating spaces.

landscape painting by Jangdeok

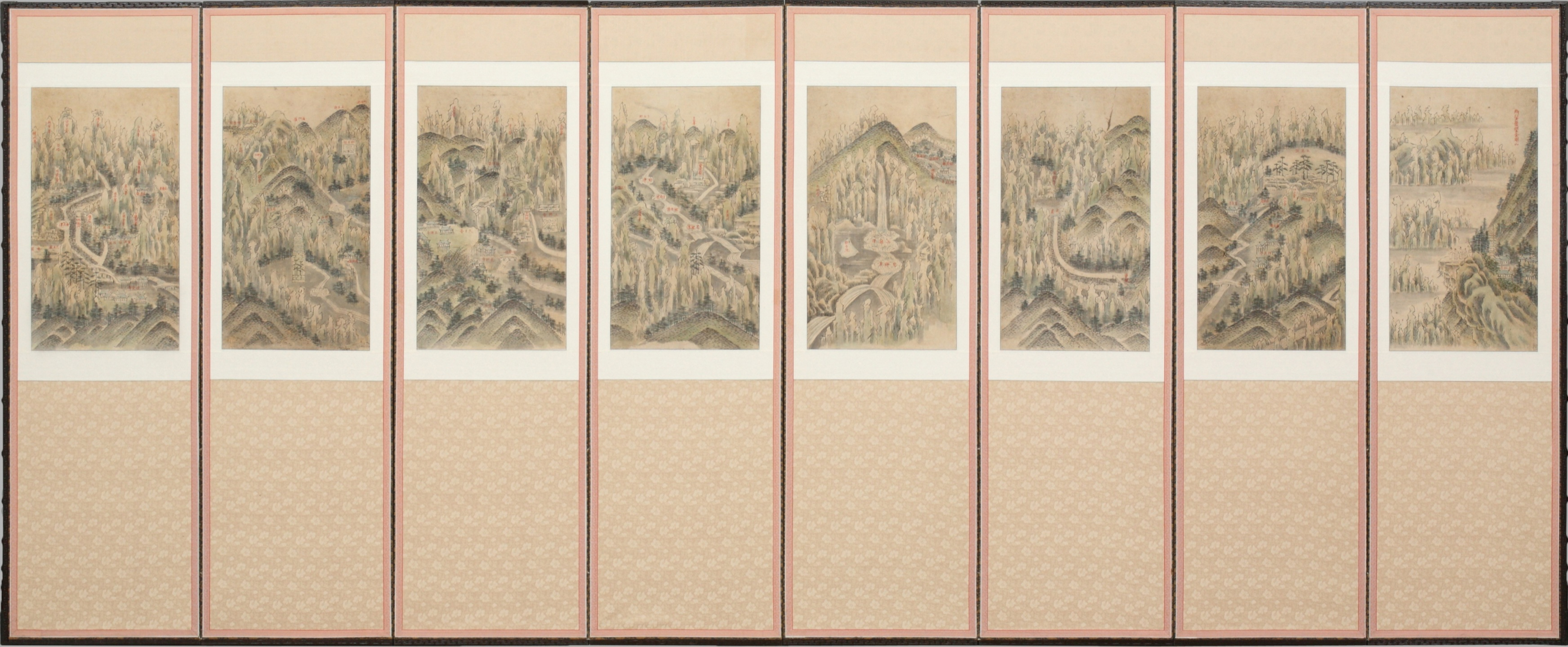
8 folding screens

6 folding screens

Geumgangsando Byeongpung

== History ==
Byeongpung have been used since the Han dynasty in China and were widely used during the Tang dynasty. And Korea exported folding screens to Japan during the reign of King Sinmun.

=== Goryeo Dynasty (A.D. 918-1392) ===
In Korea, folding screens were first used during the Goryeo period. In the Goryeo Dogyeong (Korean: 고려도경) written by Seo-gyeong, an envoy from the Song dynasty who visited Goryeo, there is a record that the Goryeo royal family placed folding screens on all sides of the banquet hall.

=== Joseon Dynasty (1392–1897) ===
Byeongpung was also widely used during the Joseon period. The initial form was a single-seat model made from a single board. The connection screen connecting two or more boards appeared later. Usually, a byeongpung has 2 to 12 panels.

== Usage ==
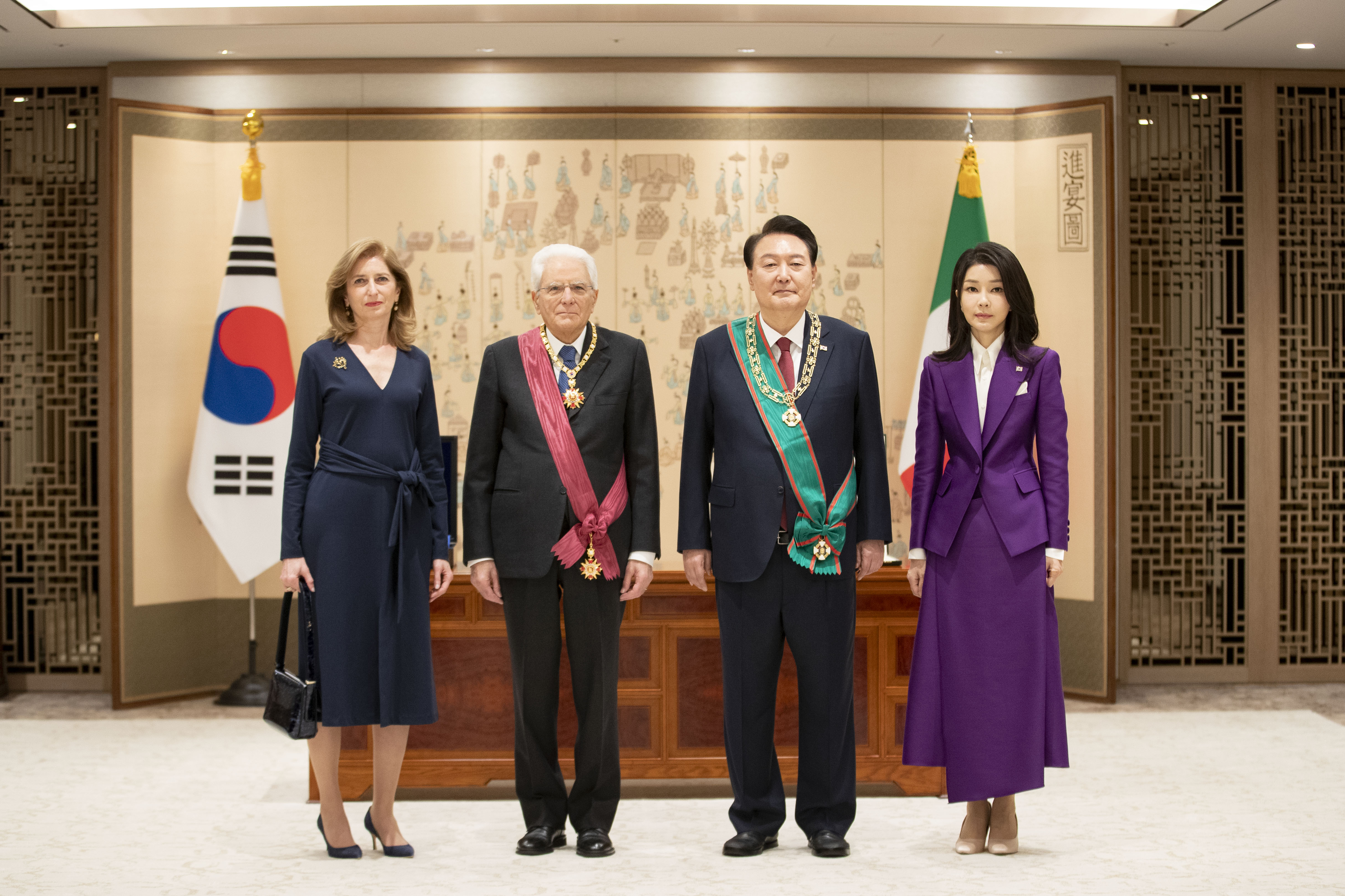
Folding screen in the South Korean Presidential Residence

When there is a major event such as a summit or award ceremony in the Cheong Wa Dae, South Korean presidential residence, photos are taken with byeongpung as the background.

== See also ==
- Korean calligraphy
- Korean art
