= Presseum =

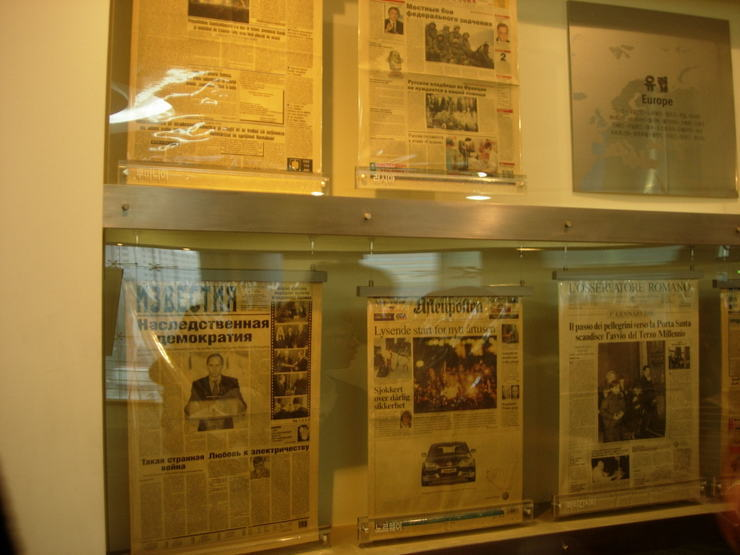
- Established: 15 December 2000
- Location: Sejongno, Jongno-gu, Seoul, South Korea
- Type: newspaper museum
- Collection size: 5000 pieces
- Website: presseum.or.kr

Korean name
- Hangul: 신문박물관
- Hanja: 新聞博物館
- RR: Sinmun bangmulgwan
- MR: Sinmun pangmulgwan

The Presseum (Korean: 신문 박물관) is the only newspaper museum of South Korea, situated on Sejongno, in Jongno District, central of Seoul. The museum was established and is operated by The Dong-A Ilbo, one of the four major newspaper companies of South Korea. Presseum is a compound word to denote "press" and "museum" which represents its character as a newspaper museum. Presseum is located on the third and fourth floors of the Dong-a Media Center and consists of three exhibition rooms; "Newspaper Hall", "Special Exhibition Hall" and "Media Education Hall".

== See also ==
- Ilmin Museum of Art
- List of museums in Seoul
- List of museums in South Korea

== Sources ==
- Huh Mun-myeong (April 11, 2008). "Newseum and Presseum". The Dong-A Ilbo.
- Heo Jae-sung (March 1, 2003). "Presseum offers historical panorama of newspapers". English Newspaper of Hankuk University of Foreign Studies. Archived from the original on July 22, 2011.
