= The Dong-A Ilbo =

South Korean daily newspaper

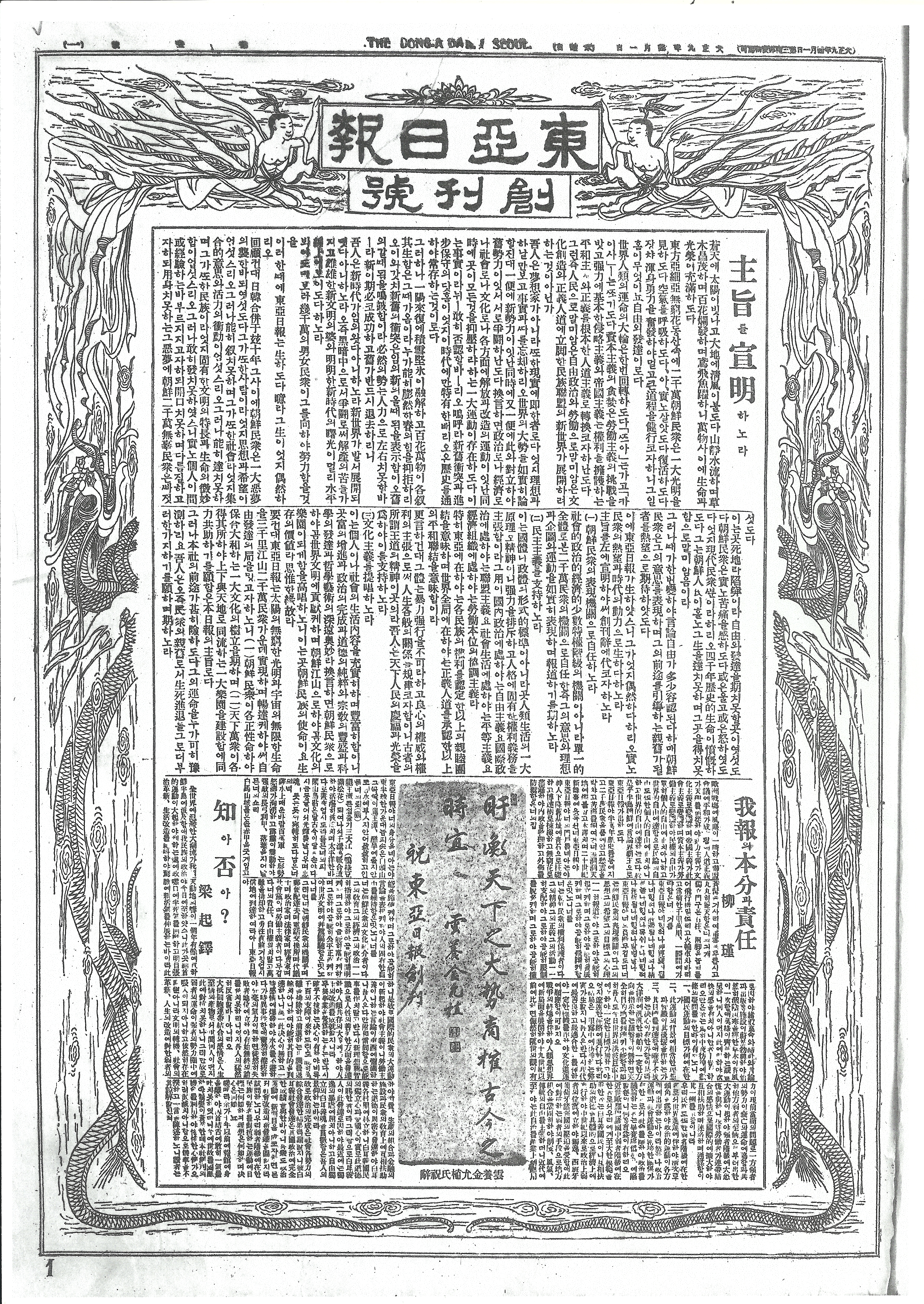
- First issue on 1 April 1920
- Type: Daily newspaper
- Format: Broadsheet
- Owner: Donga Media Group
- Founders: Kim Seong-su; Yang Kit'ak; Chang Tŏksu; Yoo Geun
- Publisher: Kim Jae-Ho (CEA)
- Founded: 1 April 1920; 106 years ago
- Political alignment: Right-wing; Conservatism (South Korean); Historical (1920 – 1975): Liberalism (South Korean)
- Country: South Korea
- Website: english.donga.com

Korean name
- Hangul: 동아일보
- Hanja: 東亞日報
- RR: Donga ilbo
- MR: Tonga ilbo

The Dong-A Ilbo (Korean: 동아일보; lit. 'East Asia Daily') is a daily Korean-language newspaper published in South Korea. It is considered a newspaper of record in the country, and was founded in 1920. The paper has been a significant presence in Korean society and history, especially during the 1910–1945 Japanese colonial period, when it was seen as a forerunner in the Korean independence movement.

The Dong-A Ilbo is the parent company of Dong-a Media Group (DAMG), which is composed of 11 affiliates including Sports Dong-a, Dong-a Science, DUNet, and dongA.com, as well as Channel A, general service cable broadcasting company launched on 1 December 2011. It covers a variety of areas including news, drama, entertainment, sports, education, and movies.

The Dong-A Ilbo has partnered with international news companies such as The New York Times of the United States, The Asahi Shimbun of Japan and The People's Daily of China. It has correspondents stationed in major cities worldwide, including Washington D.C., New York, San Francisco, Beijing, Tokyo, Cairo and Paris. It also publishes global editions in 90 cities worldwide including New York, London, Paris and Frankfurt.

== History ==
=== Background ===
One of the newspaper's early logos

Many of the earliest modern Korean newspapers flourished during the early Korean Empire period. However, concurrently, the Empire of Japan was rapidly encroaching on Korean sovereignty. Japan increasingly pressured Korean newspapers to close, and by the time of Korea's official colonization in 1910, only a handful were left. This included the Korean-language Maeil sinbo, which was de facto operated by the Japanese colonial government. Colonial restrictions on the Korean press and freedom of speech were initially tight; by 1915, the last remaining Korean-owned newspaper Gyeongnam Ilbo was pressured to close, which left the Maeil sinbo as the only Korean-language newspaper allowed in Korea.

In 1919, the nationwide March First Movement protests took Japan by surprise. The colonial government violently suppressed the protests, then began making significant policy changes to prevent future unrest. It announced that it would allow a limited number of Korean-owned newspapers to be established. The first three newspapers approved for publication were The Chosun Ilbo (established on March 5, 1920; a month before The Dong-A Ilbo), The Dong-A Ilbo, and the pro-Japan Sisa ch'ongbo, although the latter paper would close the following year.

=== Founding ===
Journalist (and later Vice President of South Korea) Kim Seong-su, on behalf of a staff of 78 people, successfully applied for the paper's creation. The Dong-A Ilbo published its first issue on April 1, 1920. Pak Yŏnghyo served as the paper's first president, and Yang Kit'ak and Yu Kŭn (유근; 柳瑾) as its editorial directors (편집감독). Its first editor-in-chief was Chang Tŏksu. At the time of its founding, it had 23 regional offices in all but two provinces of Korea. By the end of the month, it had offices in all provinces.

The newspaper initially published four pages per issue. It increased this to six on August 1, 1925, to eight in September 1929, ten in September 1934, and twelve in January 1936. During its six-page phase, it briefly published two issues per day, in the mornings and evenings, making it the first Korean newspaper to do so. It resumed and kept this practice in November 1932.

Its pricing was initially 4 sen per issue and 75 per month. It initially suffered financial difficulties, and raised its prices four months after its start. Despite this, by April 1924, it had raised enough to construct a new office building. It was completed in December 1926, and was in front of Gwanghwamun.

The newspaper quickly proved to be a success. The paper was highly popular as a venue for sharing foreign ideas. It soon assumed a prominent place in Korean society; employment at the newspaper came to be seen as prestigious. According to colonial government statistics, in 1928, the newspaper had a circulation of 40,968. By contrast, Maeil sinbo's circulation was 23,946, The Chosun Ilbo's was 18,320, and the Chungoe ilbo's was 15,460. According to historian Michael Shin, it had sales of 37,802 copies by 1929, compared to 24,286 for The Chosun Ilbo and 23,015 for Maeil sinbo.

=== Pro-independence advocacy ===
Throughout the Japanese colonial period, the newspaper advocated for the rights of Koreans and for the Korean independence movement. On April 15, just two weeks after its first issue, it published an article about March First Movement–related protests in Pyongyang, which caused its publication to be briefly suspended. In September 1920, it published an article that was deemed insulting to the Imperial Regalia of Japan, and the paper was put on indefinite suspension. The suspension was lifted in January 1921. During this period, in November 1920, The Dong-A Ilbo journalist Chang Tŏkjun was killed by Japanese soldiers while investigating a massacre of Koreans by Japanese soldiers in Hunchun, Manchuria. He became the first Korean reporter to be killed while reporting.

In April 1924, the Sikdowon Incident (식도원 사건) occurred. The Dong-A Ilbo published critical articles about pro-Japanese Korean organizations, which led to backlash from those groups. One of these groups (각파유지연맹; 各派有志聯盟) requested a meeting with the newspaper's president Song Jin-woo and executive director (취체역) Kim Seong-su to the restaurant Sikdowon. The pair were then threatened at gunpoint. News of the incident spread rapidly, with Koreans around the country expressing outrage.

In March 1926, it published a speech about the anniversary of the March First Movement, which brought another suspension that would be lifted the following month. In April 1930, it republished a letter from an American journalist that advocated for the Korean independence movement, which resulted in a suspension until September.

=== Sohn Kee-chung uniform scandal ===
Ethnic Korean marathoner Sohn Kee-chung became the first Korean to win a gold medal at the 1936 Summer Olympics in Berlin. However, because Korea was under Japanese rule, his uniform featured the Japanese flag. Lee Kil-yong, Lee Sang-beom, and others worked together to erase the Japanese flag off Sohn's uniform, and published the image in the paper. The morning after the publication in August 1936, about 10 journalists of Dong-a Ilbo were hauled off to the police station where they were beaten and tortured. The paper was suspended from then until June 1937.

=== Increased repression and forced closure ===
With the rise of the Second Sino-Japanese War in 1937, the colonial government tightened restrictions on Korea. It censored and applied increasing pressure on The Dong-A Ilbo; in one instance, the government ordered the paper to remove an image of the Hibiscus syriacus flower (무궁화; mugunghwa; a symbol of Korea) from its logo. In 1940, the colonial government announced a policy that has since been dubbed One Province, One Company (1道1社; 1도 1사). Under this policy, both Japanese- and Korean-language newspapers were made to consolidate to one per region. As part of this effort, The Dong-A Ilbo and The Chosun Ilbo were forced to close on August 10, which again left the Maeil Sinbo as the only prominent Korean-language newspaper allowed in Korea, although several minor Korean-language newspapers continued to be published. Much of the printing equipment and staff for the Korean-owned papers was transferred to either the Maeil sinbo or the de facto official Japanese-language publication Keijō nippō.

=== Liberation of Korea and interwar period ===
On August 15, 1945, Japan announced that it would surrender to the Allies, which signaled the liberation of Korea. Printing equipment was still held by the Maeil sinbo and Keijō nippō; the remnants of the colonial government protected the equipment from being seized by Koreans even weeks after the surrender. In September, the United States arrived and established the United States Army Military Government in Korea (USAMGIK) south of the 38th parallel, which encompassed Seoul. The U.S. allowed for greater freedom of the press for Koreans, and facilitated the closure of the Japanese-owned papers and transfer of printing equipment to the Koreans.

After five years and four months on hiatus, The Dong-A Ilbo released an issue on December 1, 1945. However, the left-right political divide intensified after the liberation and division of Korea. The Dong-A Ilbo sided with the right-leaning Koreans.

=== Korean War ===
On June 25, 1950, North Korea launched an invasion of the South, which began the Korean War. The Dong-A Ilbo published an issue on June 27, 1950, and then went on hiatus as Seoul was captured in the First Battle of Seoul. The Second Battle of Seoul saw Seoul's liberation by September 28; the paper resumed publication with a two-page issue on October 4. However, the Third Battle of Seoul and retreat from Seoul on January 4, 1951 caused the paper to go on hiatus again, and the paper was reestablished on January 10 in Busan, which was then serving as the provisional capital. There, the paper shared printing equipment with local newspapers; they struggled to print even two-page issues. In February 1952, they finished construction on a temporary headquarters in Toseong-dong. However, the paper published critically about the Syngman Rhee administration, which it described as dictatorial. This caused the paper to eventually be indefinitely suspended (for its fifth time) on March 15, 1955. The suspension was lifted a month later.

=== Post-war period ===
In April 1960, the pro-democracy April Revolution protests against Rhee occurred. In December, the newspaper published an article that drew the ire of protestors, which caused 1,000 people to demonstrate at its offices. The following year, Park Chung Hee launched the May 16 coup and established a military dictatorship. Park's administration imposed restrictions on the press; The Dong-A Ilbo was allowed to print 36 pages per week in the evenings. This limit was increased to 48 pages per week in March 1970.

By the 1970s, The Dong-A Ilbo was seen as one of the most prestigious newspapers in Korea to work for, in part because of its historical role as a vanguard in the Korean independence movement.

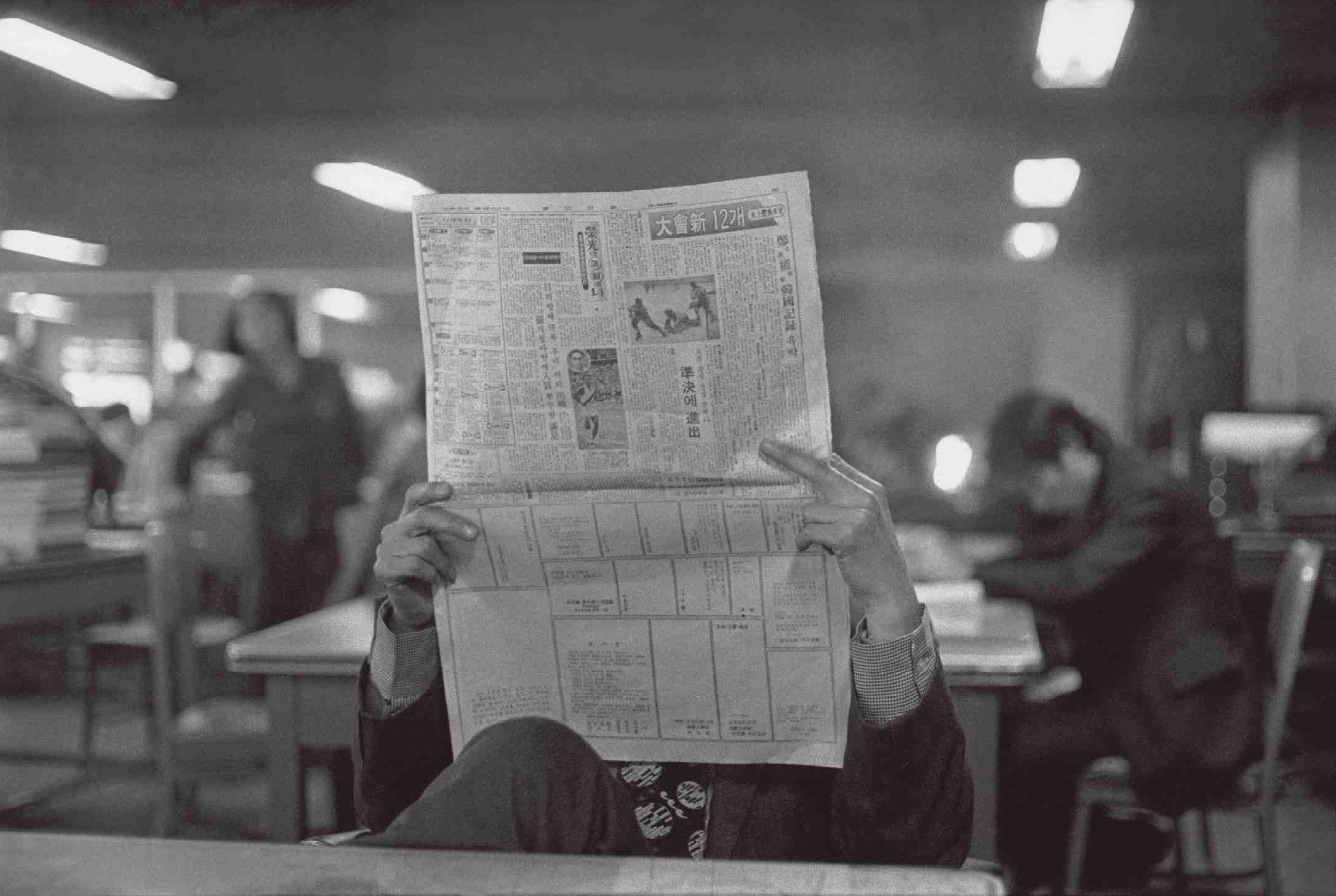
An issue of The Dong-A Ilbo with blank advertisements (January 1975)

In the 1970s, The Dong-A Ilbo advocated for greater press freedom, in what has dubbed the "Fight for Press Freedom" (자유언론수호투쟁). On October 24, 1974, one of their issues was censored by the government, and prevented from being published. In protest of this, The Dong-A Ilbo published a public statement demanding more press freedom. The Park Chung Hee administration then contacted various companies that advertised in The Dong-A Ilbo, and pressured them to break their contracts with the newspaper. This led to the December 1974 The Dong-A Ilbo blank advertisement incident, where no advertisements were published in a number of issues of the paper for months. The newspaper and other media outlets were pressured into firing journalists who published critically about the Park administration. The newspaper attempted to compensate for their losses with private donations and by downsizing. On February 28, 1975, management of the paper held a meeting where it was agreed that they would fire some staff members who were the most vocal about freedom of the press. On March 8, the paper fired 18 employees, then fired an additional two more who protested the firings. Over a hundred of the paper's staff protested the firings, and staged a sit-in and hunger strike in the company offices. The strike was framed as a "riot", and was broken using force; the striking reporters were dragged out of the offices. By the time the unrest largely ended, almost half of the paper's staff had been fired or left. Pressure on the paper was lifted by July 1975. According to a reporter who wrote about this incident in The Hankyoreh in 2012, The Dong-A Ilbo became much more conservative and pro-government since the incident, and is still considered a conservative paper.

== Timeline ==
- 1920-09-25: The first suspension for indefinite period of time: for printing the article "Discussing the Problems with Rituals" which were critical of three items sacred to Japan
- 1926-03-06: The second suspension for printing a message celebrating the March 1 protest
- 1930-04-16: The third suspension for printing "The Dong-A Ilbo Plays an Important Role in Chosun's Current Situation" which was a letter sent by a press in US in support of Korea
- 1931-03-21: Held the 1st Dong-a Marathon Games, Korea's first marathon race
- 1936-08-29: The fourth suspension: for erasing the Japanese flag from Korean born Olympic gold medalist
- 1940-08-10: Forced closure by the Japanese government
- 1945-12-01: Re-opening of Dong-a Ilbo
- 1961-03-15: Articles were printed criticizing the legitimacy of the May 15 election (lead to the April revolution)
- 1963-03-17: Published newspaper without editorials in protest to the continued military rule
- 1963-04-25: Opened Dong-a Broadcasting Station. The first media company to own print and broadcast media
- 1964-07-15: Establishment of Children's Dong-a
- 1967-01-28: Establishment of Dong-a Annual
- 1971-08-17: Staff reporters receive Korea Reporter's Award
- 1974-10-24: Announced the Free Press Declaration
- 1974-11-20: Awarded for efforts made in freedom of speech by US Freedom House
- 1974-12-20: Published blank advertisements in protest of the tyrannical military administration's advertisement oppression
- 1975-04-18: Dong-a Ilbo President Sang-man Kim receives Press Freedom Golden Pen award
- 1980-11-30: Dong-a Broadcasting Station closed due to the mandatory merger by the military government forces
- 1984-04-01: Establishment of Dong-a Music (magazine)
- 1986-01-01: Establishment of Dong-a Science
- 1987-01-16: Exclusively reported the torture and death of Park Jong-chul, which acted as a catalyst for the June democracy uprising
- 1993-04-01: Changed from an evening newspaper to a morning newspaper
- 1994-03-21: Established Ilmin (People's) Culture Foundation
- 1996-10-01: Began internet news service: DongA.com
- 1996-12-19: Ilmin Museum of Art opened in the former Dong-a Ilbo newspaper building
- 2000-01-01: Moves into Dong-a Media Centre in the Gwanghwamun area
- 2000-12-15: Newspaper museum "Presseum" opened
- 2001-07-01: World edition of paper printed in over 90 cities
- 2002-01-01: Starting of Dong-a Ilbo's mobile services
- 2002-01-04: The first Korean newspaper company to publish the weekend section, Weekend
- 2003-04-01: Introduced the Knowledge Management System (KMS), 'Genie'.
- 2005-07-15: On and Off-line Newsroom unifies
- 2005-08-17: Begins printing 32 pages of Dong-a Ilbo in color

=== Feminist movement ===
In 1933, Dong-a Ilbo launched The New Women (later to become Dong-a Women.) The publication held events such as cooking schools and wives' picnic providing women a place to socialize outside of the home. Articles such as "The New Woman and Education", "Liberation of Women and the Nuclear Family" and "Women and Career" were printed to stimulate women's participation in society and the development of women's rights. Dong-a Ilbo also hosted athletic events for women. "Women's National Tennis Competition" is Korea's and Dong-a's oldest contest ever to be held.

The paper is considered a newspaper of record in Korea.

=== Awards and recognition ===
- Receives Korea's Best Brand Award (2006)
- Dong-a Ilbo President Sang-man Kim receives Press Freedom Golden Pen award (1975)
- Awarded for efforts made in freedom of speech by US Freedom House (1974)
- Staff reporters receive Korea Reporter's Award (1971)

== Company ==
=== Readership ===
- Circulation: over 52 million
- About 51% of the readers are in their 30s - 40s
- Over 50% of the readers live in metropolitan area
- 55% of the readers are university educated or higher

=== International partnerships ===
Dong-a Ilbo has partnered with internationally acclaimed news companies such as the New York Times and Reuters. They share information including articles and video clips. Dong-a Ilbo also prints global editions in 90 cities such as Washington DC, London, Paris, Frankfurt, etc., and has 22 branches worldwide including LA, Vancouver, Osaka. It also has international correspondents stationed in 6 cities with New York, Tokyo, and Beijing among them. Also, the digital edition of the paper is available in English, Japanese and Chinese.

- Partnership:
  - The Times (UK)
  - Asahi Shimbun (Japan)
  - People's Daily (China)
  - Izvestia (Russia)
  - Sydney Morning Herald (Australia)

=== Publishing ===
Dong-a Ilbo also has an active publishing sector which produces magazines and books. There are four monthly magazines, two weekly magazines and one annual magazine. The literature sector concentrates on translating and distributing foreign material and also creating domestic content. DongA Books has brought to Korea many international bestsellers and award-winning literature as well as creating million sellers on its own.

- Magazines:
  - Shin Dong-a (Current events magazine)
  - Women's Dong-a (Women's magazine)
  - Dong-a Science (Popular science magazine)
  - Dong-a Science KIDS
  - Weekly Dong-a
  - Weekend
  - Dong-a Annual
- Books
  - Interpreter of Maladies by Jhumpa Lahiri (a Pulitzer winning fiction)
  - A Walk in the Woods by Bill Bryson (an international bestseller)
  - Sponge series (Korean content) has sold over a million copies

=== New and multi-media services ===
Dong-a Ilbo has been investing in many ventures that integrate technology into the method of spreading the news. First was the establishment of DongA.com which is the online version of the paper with much more content. It provides space for discussion and submission by the readers. From the success of the on-line content, the company also started its mobile services allowing readers to seek out the news wherever and whenever they are. With recent partnership with Reuters, Dong-a aims to add multimedia services to its methods. With raw video feeds from Reuters which Dong-a has the right to edit for its own use, DongA.com aims to reach its readers through text, images and video.

== Community service ==
Dong-a Ilbo has always recognized its responsibility as a public corporation. As stated in Dong-a DNA, humanism is a great part of Dong-a Ilbo. It has a Culture & Sports Operations department (New Project Bureau) that works to raise awareness of different areas in arts and sports as well as promote healthy lifestyles. The company also has many foundations and scholarships for the less fortunate students in the country.

=== Arts ===
Dong-a Ilbo holds annual competition of high quality as well as hosting many cultural exhibitions.

- International Music Concours
- Dong-a Theatre Awards
- DongA-LG International Animations Competition
- Rembrandt and 17th Century Netherland Painters Exhibition (2007)

and more

=== Sports ===
Dong-a Ilbo hosts annual competitions for various sports of different levels. It first began its program to raise awareness and help promote areas in sports that were less popular.

- Seoul International Marathon
- High School Baseball Tournament
- Dong-a Swim Meet

and more

=== Education ===
Dong-a holds annual competitions to help the brightest students. Other sectors such as Dong-a Science has its own educational program which also holds competitions to award the talented.

- National English Competition (University & high school division)
- National Scientific Essay Contest (hosted by DongA Science)

=== Charity ===
Dong-a Ilbo has established many foundations and scholarships for students and children of less fortunate circumstances. It has also established a foundation which promotes peace and culture.

- Dong-a Dream Tree's Foundation: Scholarship foundation
- Inchon Foundation: Founded in celebration of Kim, Sung-soo. Scholarship foundation.
- 21st Century Peace Foundation: Promotes peace and harmony between North and South Korea through various means of communication and more

== See also ==
- Channel A (Korea)
- Communications in South Korea
- Ilmin Museum of Art
- List of newspapers in South Korea
- Presseum
