= Suh Yongsun =

South Korean artist (born 1951)

- Born: 1951 (age 74–75); Seoul, South Korea
- Education: Seoul National University
- Known for: Painting, sculpture
- Awards: Artist of the Year; 2009
- Website: http://www.suhyongsun.com

Suh Yongsun, also Yong Sun Suh or Seo Young-Sun (Korean: 서용선; born 1951 in Seoul, South Korea), is a Korean painter and sculptor. In his art he mainly portrays human existence.

Suh lives and has his main studio in Gyeonggido near Seoul.

== Life ==
Suh Yongsun studied Fine Arts at Seoul National University from 1975 to 1982 and worked as a professor at the College of Fine Arts at this University from 1986 to 2008. After withdrawing from his long-time professorship, he was elected Korea's Artist of the Year for 2009 and honored with a solo show at the National Museum of Contemporary Art, South Korea.

He was invited to residency programs in Vermont in the United States of America in 1995 and to the Monash University in Melbourne, Australia, both in 2006 and in 2010. He also worked at the University of Paris in 2003. In 2001 he was a visiting professor in Hamburg, Germany. Currently, his work is represented by Gallery Chang, NY.

== Work ==
In his art, Suh brings together traditional Korean styles with Western and especially European influences such as German Expressionism and Francis Bacon.

In the early 1980s he began with painting a series of pine trees. A few years later he changed to the topic of social and historic subjects. Since then he "explores various subjects including portrait, scenery, history, war, myth, etc, but he is most well known for his work expressing humanity in a metropolitan environment, as well as his historical series that depicts historical accidents."

Visiting New York City and Berlin strongly influenced his paintings, which often show urban scenes with roughly executed human figures that often appear masked.

== Exhibitions ==
Suh Yongsun's artworks have been presented in many museums and galleries.

- 2026: Gallery Chang, New York, NYC, USA
- 2011: Festart, Osaka, Japan
- 2011: galerie son, Berlin
- 2010: "The Flower on the Snow", Daejeon Museum of Art, Daejeon, Korea
- 2009: "Artist of the Year", National Museum of Contemporary Art, Gwacheon, Korea
- 2009: "Remembering the Future", Parksoogun Museum, Yanggu, Korea
- 2009: "Beginning of New Era", National Museum of Contemporary Art, Seoul, Korea
- 2005: Crecloo Art Gallery, New York, USA
- 2004: Ilmin Museum of Art, Seoul, Korea
- 2004: Gwangju Biennale, Gwangju, Korea
- 2001: Cultural department of the Korean Embassy, Berlin, Germany
- 2001: The Traveling Museum, National Museum of Contemporary Art, Korea, Gwacheon
- 2001: Seoul Museum of Art, Seoul, Korea
- 2001: Korean modern art: Reinstatement of painting, National Museum of Contemporary Art, Seoul, Korea
- 2001: Exposition de echanges interuniverstaires 2001, Galerie Bernanos, Paris, France
- 2000: Contemporary Art from Korea, UNESCO Palace, Beirut, Lebanon
- 1999: Korea contemporary art - The sound of nature, Triangle Gallery, Calgary, Alberta, Canada
- 1996: '96 Seoul Art Exhibition, Seoul City Museum, Seoul, Korea
- 1995: Korea-China, Art Center, Seoul, Korea
- 1993: Self Portrait Drawing, Swan Gallery, New York, USA
- 1990: "Expression & Imagination", Contemporary Art Exchange Show, Dong-bang Museum of Art & Los Angeles Art Core Gallery, USA
- 1987: 19th Cagnue International Painting Exhibition, Cagnue, France

== Projects ==
- 2009: "The Wall in the World", Art Project, Berlin
- 2008: Director of Tri Angle Project
- 2007: Director of CheolAm Public Art Project (murals)
- 2001: CheolAm mine village art project

== Awards (selection) ==
- 2009: "Artist of the Year 2009" (National Museum of Contemporary Art, Gwacheon, Korea)

== Publications ==
- "1975-2007 SUH Yongsun I, II, III", Gallery 604, Busan, 2010
- "Artist of the Year 2009 SUH Yongsun", National Museum of Contemporary Art, Korea, Gwacheon, 2009
- "SUH Yongsun", Art Vivant, Sigongsa, Seoul, 1994
