= Um Da-woon =

South Korean footballer

Um Da-Woon
Personal information
- Full name: Um Da-Woon (엄다운)
- Date of birth: July 27, 1985 (age 41)
- Place of birth: Ulsan, South Korea
- Height: 1.79 m (5 ft 10 in)
- Position: Defender

Senior career*
Years	Team	Apps	(Gls)
2006–2007	Changwon City FC		
- * Club domestic league appearances and goals as of Sep 2 2008

Um Da-Woon (Korean: 엄다운; Hanja: 嚴茶雲; born July 27, 1985) is a South Korean football player who was a defender for Changwon City FC in the National League of South Korea.
