= Junggeun Oh =

South Korean painter (born 1970)

- Born: September 27, 1970 (age 55); Seoul, South Korea
- Education: Seoul National University
- Known for: Painting, Graphics
- Notable work: the interspaces (Die Zwischenräume)
- Website: www.junggeun-oh.com

Junggeun Oh, also Oh Jung Geun (Korean: 오정근; born 27 September 1970), is a South Korean painter. Living in Berlin since 2004 he paints artworks of a modern minimalism mixing abstraction with realism. The artist is represented by galerie son, Berlin.

== Life ==
He was born in Seoul, South Korea.

Junggeun Oh studied Fine Arts at Seoul National University in South Korea. During that time he already had been working as a teacher at Sun-Hwa College of Fine Arts in Seoul and as a lecturer at Won-Kwang University Iksan. In 2004 he moved with his family to Berlin.
He won several awards and scholarships.

== Work ==
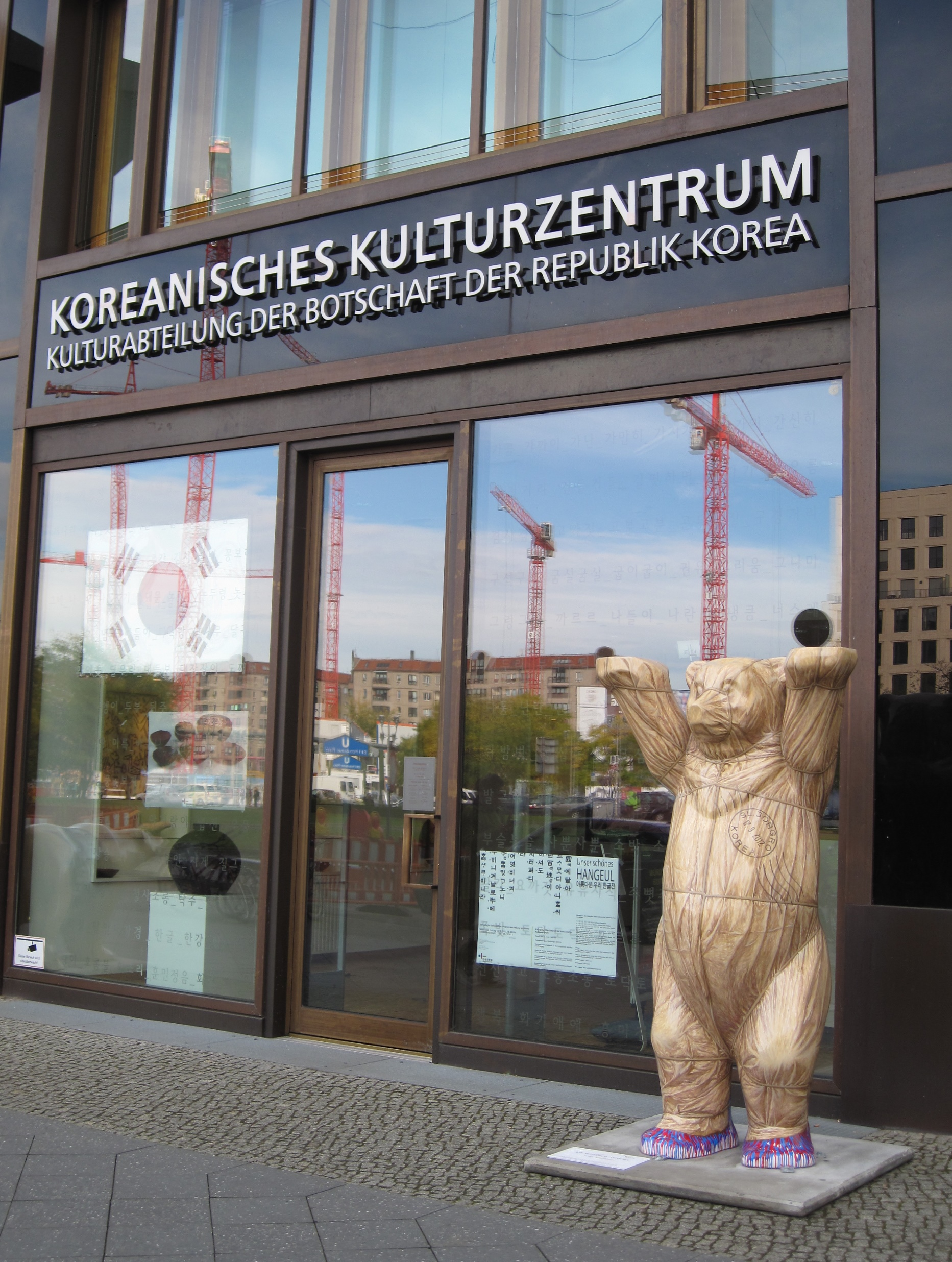
Buddy Bär at Leipziger Platz, Berlin

In the early 2000 years Junggeun Oh created highly detailed woodprints that were sometimes over-sized and made of more than 40 plates each.
Since living in Berlin Oh has been working on his series "interspaces" (in German "Zwischenräume"). Herein he paints (mostly in red) the shapes that buildings draw in the sky as minimalistic abstract forms. 2012 Junggeun Oh designed a Buddy Bear for the embassy of South Korea.

== Publications ==
- Junggeun OH, THE PAGE GALLERY, Korea, Seoul, 2012
