= Cho Ki-jung =

South Korean potter

- Hangul: 조기정
- Hanja: 曺基正
- RR: Jo Gijeong
- MR: Cho Kijŏng

Cho Ki-jung (June 22, 1939 – December 20, 2007) was a South Korean potter who was designated as living treasure by the Gwangju Metropolitan Government in 1986 for his achievement to revive Goryeo celadon.

== Style and nature of his work ==
He works in traditional styles. He rediscovered how to produce blue celadons of the quality of Goryeo times.

== See also ==
- List of Korean ceramic artists and sculptors
