= Chang-beom Eom =

South Korean materials scientist

Chang-beom Eom is currently the Raymond R. Holton Chair in Engineering and Theodore H. Geballe Professor in the Department of Materials Science and Engineering and Physics at the University of Wisconsin–Madison. His research interests include developing novel materials at the nanoscale and creating heteroepitaxy of complex oxide thin films and heterostructures. Eom is a Fellow of the American Physical Society, the Materials Research Society, and the American Association for the Advancement of Science, and a recipient of the Ho-Am Prize in Engineering.

== Education ==
Eom earned his bachelor's degree in 1981 from Hanyang University in Seoul, South Korea. He then attended the Korea Advanced Institute of Science and Technology and received his master's degree in 1983. He went on to complete his Ph.D. at Stanford University in 1991. Following his doctoral studies, he conducted postdoctoral research at AT&T Bell Laboratories. Later, he became an associate professor at Duke University.

== Research ==
Chang-beom Eom is a materials scientist specializing in the synthesis, integration, and characterization of complex oxide thin films and heterostructures. His research explores the fundamental properties of quantum materials, including correlated oxides and spintronic systems, with applications in next-generation electronics.

== Selected publications ==
- Edgeton, A. L. (2023). "Large spin–orbit torque in bismuthate-based heterostructures". Nature Electronics. 6 (12): 973–980. doi:10.1038/s41928-023-01080-1.
- * Guo, Lu; Shang, Shun-Li; Campbell, Neil; Evans, Paul G.; Rzchowski, Mark; Liu, Zi-Kui; Eom, Chang-Beom (2021). "Searching for a route to synthesize in situ epitaxial Pr₂Ir₂O₇ thin films with thermodynamic methods". npj Computational Materials. 7 (144). arXiv:2009.09453. doi:10.1038/s41524-021-00610-9.
- Kum, H. S. et al. "Heterogeneous integration of single-crystalline complex-oxide membranes." Nature, vol. 578, pp. 75–81, 2020.

== Awards and honors ==
- Honorary Doctoral Degree from Technical University of Denmark (DTU) (2023)
- David Turnbull Lectureship Award from the Materials Research Society (2022)
- Vannevar Bush Faculty Fellowship (2020)
- David Adler Lectureship Award in the Field of Materials Physics from the American Physical Society (2020)
- Materials Synthesis Investigator of the Emergent Phenomena in Quantum Systems (EPiQS), The Gordon and Betty Moore Foundation (2019)
- Fellow of the American Association for the Advancement of Science (2018)
- Raymond R. Holton Chair Professor of Engineering (2018–present)
- Otto Mønsted Visiting Professorships, Technical University of Denmark (DTU) (2018)
- Peabody Visiting Professor, Department of Mechanical Engineering, MIT (2014)
- Wisconsin Alumni Research Foundation Named Professorship (2013–present)
- Harvey D. Spangler Distinguished Professor of Engineering (2011–2018)
- Associate Editor of APL Materials (2013–present)
- The Board of Directors of Materials Research Society (2012)
- Fellow of Materials Research Society (2011)
- Ho-Am Prize in Engineering (2007)
- Byron Bird Award for Excellence in a Research Publication, University of Wisconsin-Madison (2007)
- Fellow of the American Physical Society (2004)
- Invited Professor of the University of Geneva, The Physics Section, Switzerland (2003)
- David and Lucile Packard Fellowship (1995)
- National Science Foundation Young Investigator Award (1994)
- J. Robert Oppenheimer Fellowship (1993)
- Eugene P. Wigner Fellowship (1993)
