= Tschoon Su Kim =

Korean painter

- Born: 1957 (age 68–69); South Korea
- Education: Seoul National University, California State University
- Known for: Painting, Graphics
- Notable work: ultramarine
- Awards: Total Grand Prix (Total Museum of Contemporary Art, Seoul), A Superior Artist (The National Academy of Arts, Seoul)

Tschoon Su Kim, also Kim, Tschoon-Su (Korean: 김춘수; born in 1957 in South Korea), is a Korean painter. He is a professor at Seoul National University and paints only in blue.

== Life ==
Tschoon Su Kim made his studies at different Universities in Korea and the USA, i.e. at Seoul National University, California State University and New York University Graduate School. In 1991 he participated in the 10th Triangle Artists Workshop, Pine Plains, New York. Kim made his research at Universidad de Alcala in Spain in 2003. Since 1996 he work as a professor for Fine Arts at Seoul National University.
He lives and works near Seoul.

== Work ==
Tschoon Su Kim's work is rooted in a tradition of gestural abstraction and the use of the color blue. Since 1990 Kim has been painting almost exclusively in blue. He researches the color's different shades in work series called Ultramarine, Blanco y Azul or Weiss und Blau and herein wakens up associations of water, heaven or trees without really having painted them.

"And that, again, means that Tschoon Su Kim's images are not only about distributed form, but also about painting itself. So they constitute an innovation of tradition, which makes them important, and of great import on contemporary art."
