= Um Tai-Jung =

South Korean abstract sculptor (born 1938)

- Born: December 18, 1938 (age 87); South Korea
- Education: Seoul National University; Saint Martin's School of Art
- Known for: Sculpture, Drawing, Painting

Korean name
- Hangul: 엄태정
- Hanja: 嚴泰丁
- RR: Eom Taejeong
- MR: Ŏm T'aejŏng
- Website: http://umtaijung.com

Um Tai-Jung (Korean: 엄태정, born December 28, 1938, Mungyeong, North Gyeongsang Province) is a representative first-generation abstract sculptor in South Korea. He graduated from the Department of Sculpture in the College of Fine Arts at Seoul National University, studied at Saint Martin's School of Art in London, and held positions as a research professor at Berlin University of the Arts and professor in the Department of Sculpture in the College of Fine Arts at Seoul National University.

== Education ==
He graduated from the Department of Sculpture and the Graduate School of Education at Seoul National University in 1964 and 1966, respectively. He served as a professor at his alma mater from 1981 to 2004.

In 2019, he was selected as the only artist in Korea to participate in the Frieze London Sculpture held in the UK. He became emeritus professor at the Seoul National University in 2004 and a member of the National Academy of Arts of the Republic of Korea in 2013.

== Selected exhibitions ==
=== Solo exhibitions ===
==== 2022 ====
- "Dream and Rejoice of Silver Wings" ARARIO MUSEUM in SPACE, Seoul, Korea

==== 2019 ====
- "A Stranger Holding Two Wings" Arario Gallery, Seoul, Cheonan, Korea

==== 2013 ====
- "Sculpture and drawing" Shinsegae Gallery, Busan, Korea

==== 2009 ====
- "Working with Iron" Sungkok Museum, Seoul, Korea

==== 2005 ====
- "Sculpture and Drawing" Georg Kolbe Museum, Berlin, Germany

==== 1997 ====
- "Bronze. Object. Age" Gallery Hyundai, Seoul, Korea

==== 1991 ====
- "Heaven, Earth and Human" Duson Gallery, Seoul, Korea

== Selected collections ==
The National Museum of Modern and Contemporary Art, Korea; Independence Hall of Korea. Seoul Museum of Art(SeMA), Pohang Museum of Steel Art(POMA), Korea; Sejong Center for the Performing Arts, Korea; Ho-Am Art Museum, Korea; Olympic Sculpture Park, Korea; Dubrova Sculpture Park, Croatia; the Supreme Court of Korea; ASEM Tower, Korea; International Sculpture Symposium. Santo tirso Porto, Portugal; and the German Chancellor's Office (Berlin) possess his works.

== Awards ==
- Main prize from the 8th Korean Artist's Day (Korean Fine Arts Association), 2014
- Mirok Li Prize from the 7th Mirok Li Award (Korean-German Association), 2012
- Sculpture Prize from the 3rd Kim Se-choong's Sculpture Award (Kim Se-Choong Cultural Foundation), 1989
- Grand Prize from the 2nd Grand Art Exhibition of Korea (The Korea Times), 1971
- Prime Minister's Prize from the 16th National Art Exhibition (The Ministry of Education, South Korea), 1967
- Participation prize from the 2nd Young Artist Award (The Ministry of Culture and Information, South Korea), 1962
