= Painter of the Wind =

2008 South Korean historical television series

- Promotional poster
- Also known as: The Painter of Wind; Garden of the Wind
- Hangul: 바람의 화원
- Hanja: 바람의畫員
- RR: Baramui hwawon
- MR: Paramŭi hwawŏn
- Genre: Historical; Romance
- Based on: Painter of the Wind by Lee Jung-myung
- Written by: Lee Eun-yeong
- Directed by: Jang Tae-yoo; Jin Hyuk
- Starring: Park Shin-yang; Moon Geun-young; Ryu Seung-ryong; Bae Soo-bin; Moon Chae-won
- Country of origin: South Korea
- Original language: Korean
- No. of episodes: 20

Production
- Executive producer: Lee Young-joon
- Production location: Korea
- Cinematography: Bae Hong-soo
- Running time: Wednesday & Thursday 21:55 (KST)
- Production companies: Drama House (JTBC Studios); IS Plus Corp.

Original release
- Network: SBS TV
- Release: 24 September – 4 December 2008

Painter of the Wind (Korean: 바람의 화원; RR: Baramui hwawon) is a 2008 South Korean historical television series starring Park Shin-yang and Moon Geun-young. Based on the bestselling historical fiction novel by Lee Jung-myung that took artistic license with the premise that perhaps the Joseon painter Shin Yun-bok had really been a woman, it centers on Yun-bok, a talented young painter who disguises herself as a boy to search for her father's murderer. She meets Kim Hong-do, a master painter who guides her into becoming a great artist, and they develop a strong friendship of mentor and disciple.

Produced for SBS by JoongAng Media Network's Drama House, the series aired on SBS TV and its regional affiliates from September 24 to December 4, 2008. It had 20 episodes.

The drama has won numerous awards, including the Asian TV Series Special Award at the 2010 Shanghai Television Festival, while actress Moon Geun-young received the grand prize at the 2008 SBS Drama Awards, as well as Best TV Actress at the 2009 Baeksang Arts Awards and 2008 Grimae Awards for her role.

== Synopsis ==
In 1766, Kang Su-hang, a painter and senior member of Dohwaseo, the Academy of Painting, was found killed after being secretly commissioned by the son of the crown prince who would later become King Jeongjo (1752–1800, the 22nd King of the Joseon Dynasty). The commission was to paint a portrait of the crown prince.

Seo Jing, another member of Dohwaseo, was found dead while investigating the death of Kang Su-hang. In addition, Seo Jing's wife was murdered and his daughter went missing. Ten years later, Kim Hong-do, a senior member of Dohwaseo, discovers Shin Yun-bok, a new student. Hong-do discovers great talent in Yun-bok and tries to protect the student from conspiracies that surround him. King Jeongjo also discovers Yun-bok's enormous talent.

Kim Hong-do and Shin Yun-bok serve as the eyes of the king, depicting the true reality of the common people. However, powerful palace officials conspire to get rid of the two painters, and soon afterwards, they are kicked out of Dohwaseo. Then, the king secretly orders the pair to find the portrait of his father, which was painted by Kang Su-hang ten years prior.

Kim Hong-do and Shin Yun-bok are successful in recovering the portrait, overcoming hurdles and dangerous traps set up by enemies. The recovery of the painting also helps reveal the secret behind the death of Seo Jing, who is actually Shin Yun-bok's father. In the process, Kim Hong-do realizes that he is truly in love with Shin Yun-bok. However, he tries to leave him because he knows that the affair would be an impossible one. But to everyone's surprise, the truth is revealed. Shin Yun-bok is actually a woman. She had disguised herself as a man to enter Dohwaseo, an institution limited only to males, in order to uncover the truth about her father's death.

== Cast ==
=== Main cast ===
- Moon Geun-young as Shin Yun-bok
  - Kim Yoo-jung as young Yun-bok
- Park Shin-yang as Kim Hong-do
- Ryu Seung-ryong as Kim Jo-nyun
- Bae Soo-bin as King Jeongjo
- Moon Chae-won as Jung-hyang, a gisaeng

=== Supporting cast ===
- Lee Joon as Shin Young-bok
  - Lee Byung-joon as young Young-bok
- Park Hyuk-kwon as Lee In-moon, Hong-do's friend
- Im Ji-eun as Queen Jeongsun
- Jung In-gi as Hong Guk-yeong
- Kim Eung-soo as Jang Byuk-soo
- Ahn Suk-hwan as Shin Han-yeong, Yun-bok's adoptive father
- Park Jin-woo as Jang Hyo-won
- Han Jung-soo as Seo Jing
- Lee Mi-young as Mok Kye-wol
- Yoon Joo-sang as Kang Su-hang
- Lee Kyung-hwa as Myeong, Seo Jing's wife
- Han Yeo-woon as Jung-sook, In-moon's sister
- Yoon Bong-gil
- Ko Kyu-pil as hwawon
- Lee Sang-hee as hwawon
- Son Hwa-ryeong as gisaeng
- Min Joon-hyun as eunuch
- Ha Dae-ro as cadet
- Kim Won-seok
- Jang Moon-seok as Dol-soi
- Choi Gwi-hwa
- Jo Dong-hee
- Kim Bo-mi as Mak-nyun, Jung-hyang's maid
- Jeon Jin-gi
- Im Ho as Lee Myung-ki
- Yoo Yun-ji
- Jeong Yu-mi
- Choi Soo-han
- Tae Hwang

== Original soundtrack ==
No.	Title	Artist	Length
1.	"Song of the Wind (바람의 노래)"	Jo Sung-mo
2.	"Line of Sight (눈 길)"	Young Ji
3.	"Tears (눈물꽃)"	HowL
4.	"Yearning (Impossible Dream...) (그리움 [이루어질 수 없는...])"	Jo Sung-mo
5.	"Still Thinking of You (그리고 그리며)"	Kim Hyuna
6.	"Yearning (Love Theme) (그리움 [Love Theme])"
7.	"Dohwaseo (도화서)"
8.	"The Painter of the Wind (Title Theme) (바람의 화원 [Title Theme])"
9.	"Ink (Tension Theme) (墨 (먹) [Tension Theme])"
10.	"The Secret Painting (비밀의 그림)"
11.	"Laughing and Crying (울다가 웃다가)"
12.	"Aged Paulownia Hides Its Melody (동천련로 항장곡)"
13.	"Street Market Scenes (저잣거리 풍경)"
14.	"Student Wears Blue in the Morning (생도청의 아침)"
15.	"Moonlight Lovers (月下情人 [월하정인])"
16.	"Long Waves (장 파 형)"
17.	"Mountain Tiger (묘향산의 호랑이)"
18.	"The Aged Paulownia Hides Its Melody (Freestyle Ver.) (동천련로 항장곡 [산조 Ver.])"
19.	"Dancing Child (舞童 [무 동])"
20.	"Student Wears Blue in the Morning (Korean Classical Ver.) 생도청의 아침 [Korean Classical Ver.]"
21.	"Competition of the Workmen (필선의 대결)"
22.	"Youth Enjoying Nature (年少踏靑 [연소답청])"

== Ratings ==
Date	Episode	Nationwide	Seoul
2008-09-24	1	11.6% (8th)	11.7% (8th)
2008-09-25	2	12.6% (9th)	12.8% (9th)
2008-10-01	3	10.7% (11th)	10.6% (13th)
2008-10-02	4	11.7% (11th)	11.4% (10th)
2008-10-08	5	12.7% (9th)	12.7% (8th)
2008-10-09	6	12.1% (9th)	11.7% (10th)
2008-10-15	Special	12.2% (8th)	12.6% (7th)
2008-10-16	Special	9.6% (15th)	10.0% (11th)
2008-10-22	7	12.6% (8th)	12.6% (8th)
2008-10-23	8	16.1% (5th)	15.8% (5th)
2008-10-29	9	15.1% (5th)	15.0% (5th)
2008-10-30	10	15.0% (6th)	15.2% (4th)
2008-11-05	11	12.5% (8th)	12.0% (7th)
2008-11-06	12	15.0% (8th)	15.0% (7th)
2008-11-12	13	11.9% (9th)	11.5% (10th)
2008-11-13	14	14.4% (8th)	14.1% (8th)
2008-11-19	15	12.9% (11th)	12.8% (10th)
2008-11-20	16	13.0% (10th)	12.1% (12th)
2008-11-26	17	13.7% (9th)	13.8% (8th)
2008-11-27	18	13.4% (10th)	12.7% (10th)
2008-12-03	19	12.7% (11th)	13.0% (9th)
2008-12-04	20	14.7% (9th)	15.2% (8th)
Average		13.2%	13.1%

Source: TNS Media Korea

== Awards and nominations ==
Year	Award	Category	Recipient	Result
2008	21st Grimae Awards	Best Achievement for a Production, Drama category	Bae Hong-soo (cinematographer)	Won
2008	21st Grimae Awards	Best Actress	Moon Geun-young	Won
2008	21st Grimae Awards	Best Lighting Director	Song Wook	Won
2008	16th Korean Culture and Entertainment Awards	Best New Actress (TV)	Moon Chae-won	Won
2008	SBS Drama Awards	Grand Prize/Daesang	Moon Geun-young	Won
2008	SBS Drama Awards	Top Excellence Award, Actor	Park Shin-yang	Nominated
2008	SBS Drama Awards	Top Excellence Award, Actress	Moon Geun-young	Nominated
2008	SBS Drama Awards	Best Supporting Actor in a Drama Special	Ryu Seung-ryong	Nominated
2008	SBS Drama Awards	Top 10 Stars	Moon Geun-young	Won
2008	SBS Drama Awards	New Star Award	Moon Chae-won	Won
2008	SBS Drama Awards	New Star Award	Bae Soo-bin	Won
2008	SBS Drama Awards	Best Young Actress	Kim Yoo-jung	Won
2008	SBS Drama Awards	Best Couple Award	Moon Geun-young and Moon Chae-won	Won
2009	45th Baeksang Arts Awards	Best Drama	Painter of the Wind	Nominated
2009	45th Baeksang Arts Awards	Best Actress (TV)	Moon Geun-young	Won
2009	45th Baeksang Arts Awards	Best New Actress (TV)	Moon Chae-won	Nominated
2009	45th Baeksang Arts Awards	Most Popular Actress (TV)	Moon Geun-young	Nominated
2009	4th Seoul International Drama Awards	Best Mini-series	Painter of the Wind	Nominated
2009	4th Seoul International Drama Awards	Best Actress	Moon Geun-young	Nominated
2009	4th Seoul International Drama Awards	Most Popular Actress	Moon Geun-young	Won
2010	43rd WorldFest-Houston International Film Festival	Silver Remi Award	Painter of the Wind	Won
2010	16th Shanghai Television Festival	Asian TV Series Special Award	Painter of the Wind	Won

== Continuity errors ==
- In E09 Sang-gung uses the pen name Hyewon... before this pen name has been given (E13).
- In E15 56:28, the bad guy is plainly played by the same actor as the mysterious man (Baek Dong-soo).
- Problems in sexagesimal cycle. When "now" is 1777 = jeong-yu 정유, then "ten years before" is 1766 = byeong-sul 병술. And not byeong-jin 병진. Both the Korean soundtrack ("everywhere") and the Chinese characters in the "secret library" (E14, 09:27) are describing 丙辰年, i.e. 1796.

== Artistic license ==
The events described by the twenty episodes are dated 1777 (=now) with flashbacks from 1766 (=ten years before). This crosscutting style between two time periods required some artistic license, with the meager historical facts known about the painters involved. Among the distortions are:

- Painter Yi Myeong-gi was only known by 1791–1796. Painting of Seo Jik-su (E08) was drawn in 1796.
- Portrait of Chae Jegong (E09) was drawn in 1792 by Yi Myeong-gi, not in 1777 by Kim Hong-do.
- Gang Se-hwang lived from 1713 to 1791, and therefore was not murdered in 1766.
- Portrait of King Taejo, Taejo Eojin, was painted in 1872.
- Dasan Jeong Yak-yong lived 1762–1836. In 1766, he hadn't drawn any machine sketches.
- Nam Gye-u lived 1811–88. His Butterflies were not painted circa 1777.

Such artistic license allowed for the screenplay to have narrative cohesion, and has been largely acknowledged by the writer. Each episode of the series begins with a foreword, stating: "The contents of this drama may not match some of the historical facts" (on the left of the text is the stylized title).

Foreword

Several academics have criticized the drama due to these historical distortions. Despite that, it resulted in an increased interest for artistic topics among the general public. An exhibit at Gansong Art Museum in Seongbuk-dong attracted 200,000 visitors when it opened on October 12, 2008, who bought more than 2,000 prints of the art on display.

== Featured paintings ==
More than forty paintings were featured in the series, providing a possible context for each of them. For the paintings from the Hyewon pungsokdo, this exercise was all the more striking since the present-day titles were not given by the painter himself, but were attributed more than a century later.

=== 외유사생 (A journey to paint from life) E01 ===
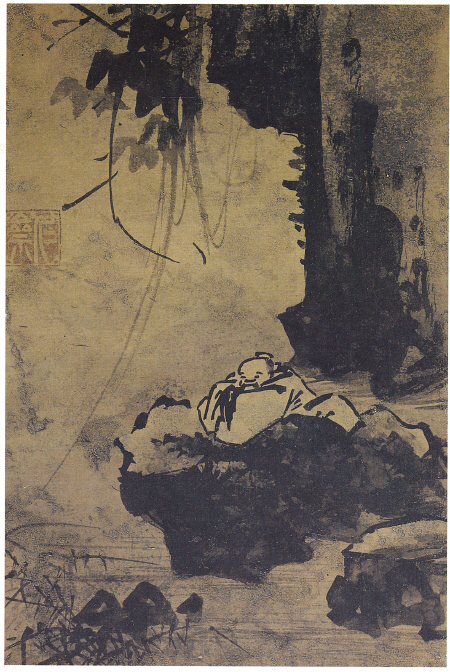
Kang Hŭian (1417–1464)
Gosa.gwansu
고사관수도
A scholar at water

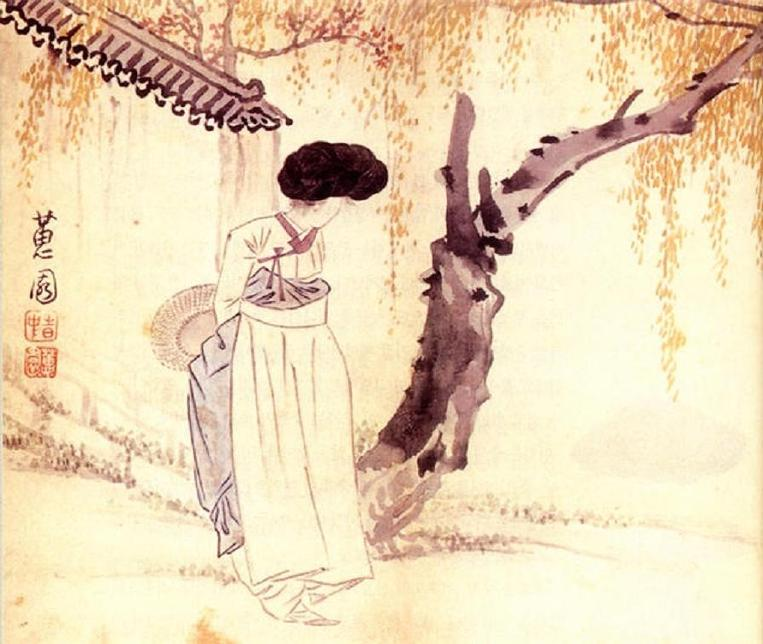
Shin Yun-bok
Gidalim
기다림
Waiting

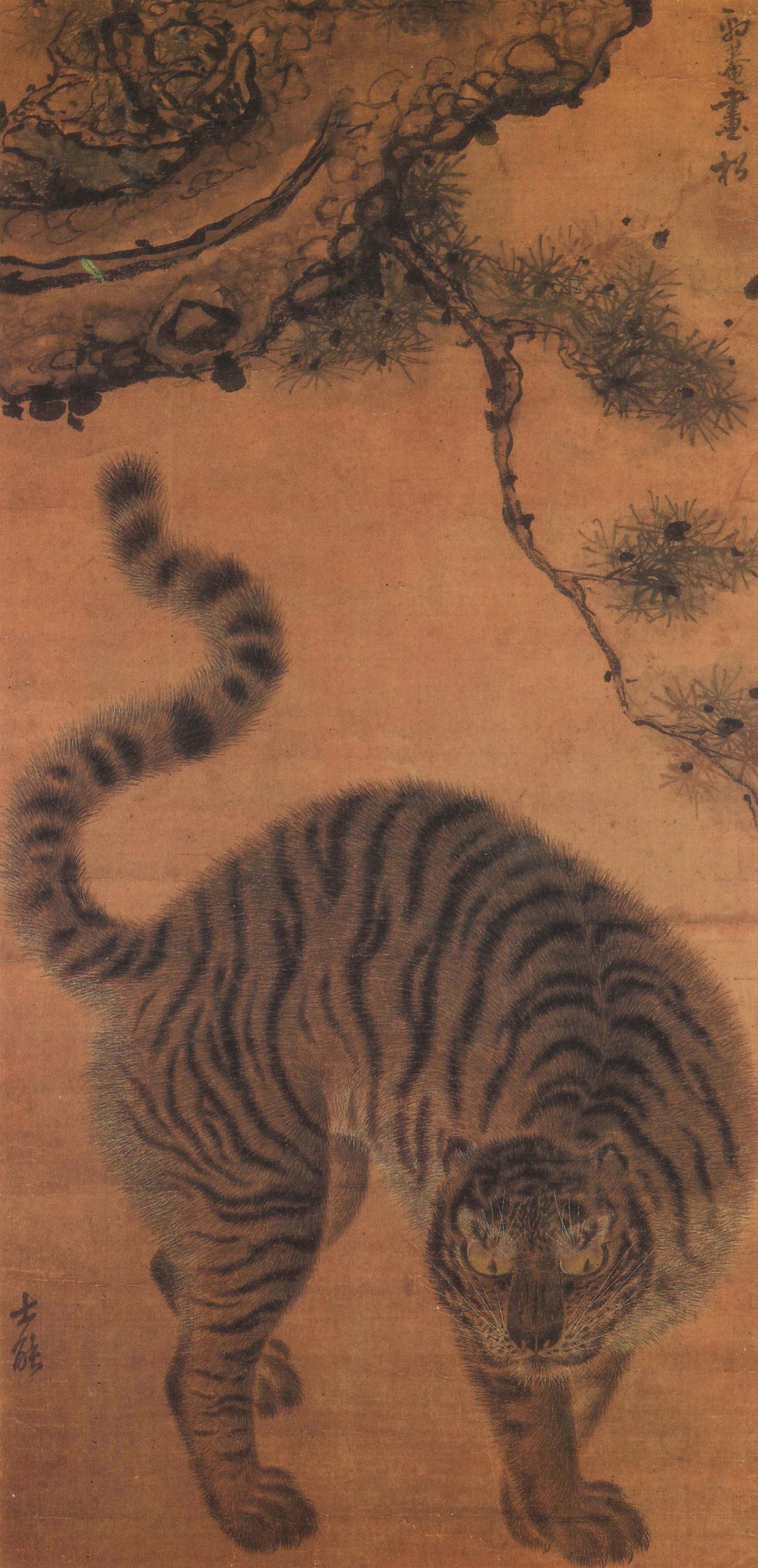
Kim Hong-do
Songha.maengho
송하맹호도
Tiger under a tree

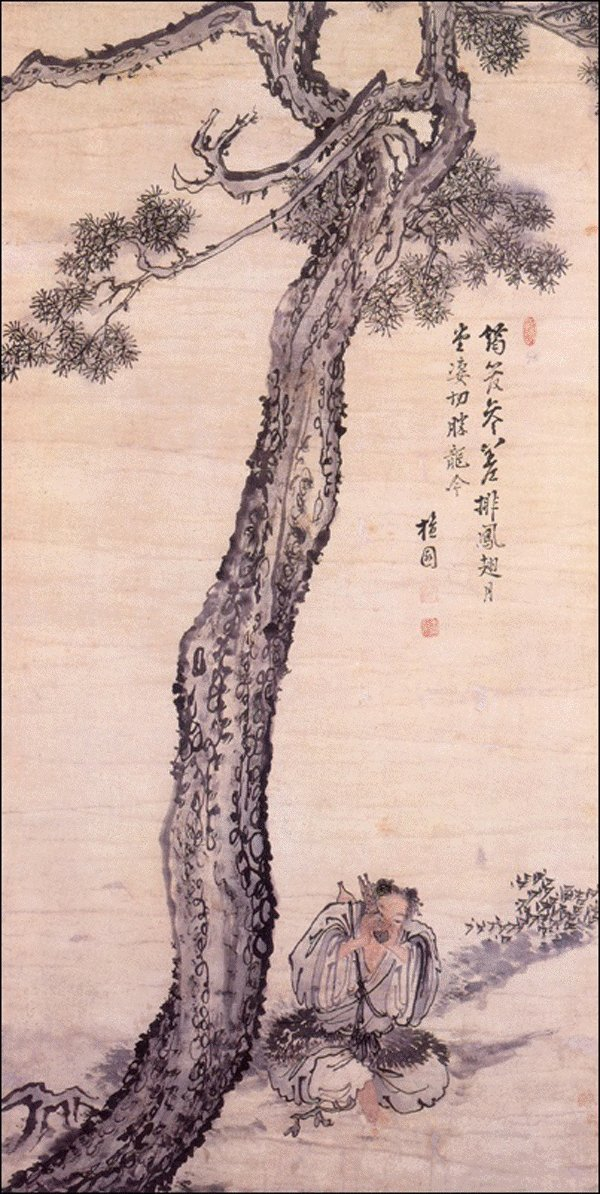
Kim Hong-do
Songha.chwisaeng
송하취생도
Drunkard under a tree

A journey to paint from life [외유사생]

=== 장파형 (Before tempest) E02 ===
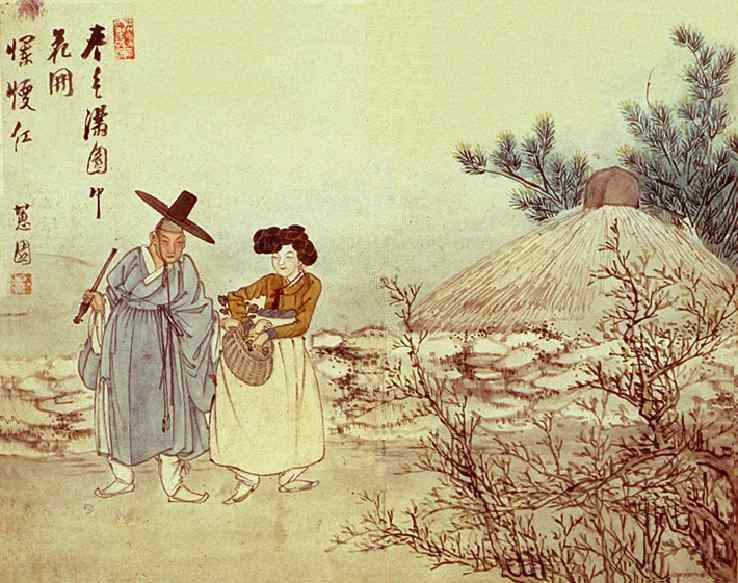
Hyewon pungsokdo
Chunsaek.manwon 춘색만원
Spring mood covers all over the places

Nine dots, four strokes

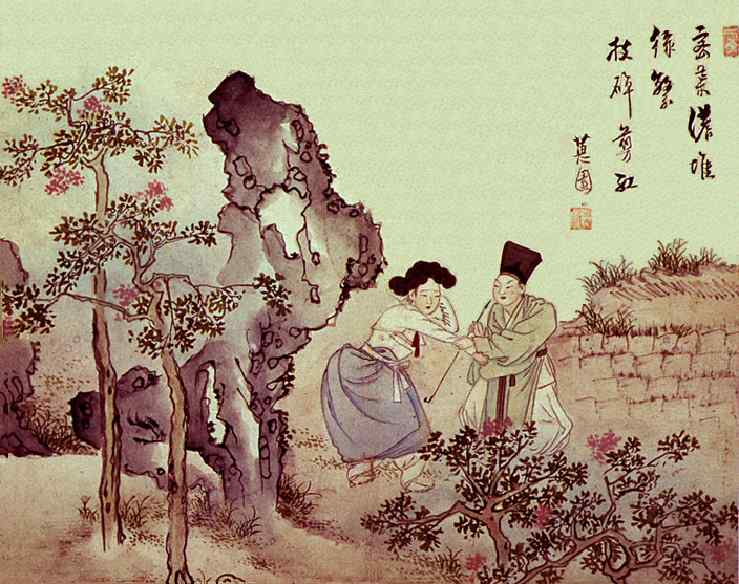
Hyewon pungsokdo
Sonyeon.jeonhong 소년전홍
Young boy plucking an azalea

Before tempest [장파형]

=== 장파형수 (Hand crushing punishment) E03 ===
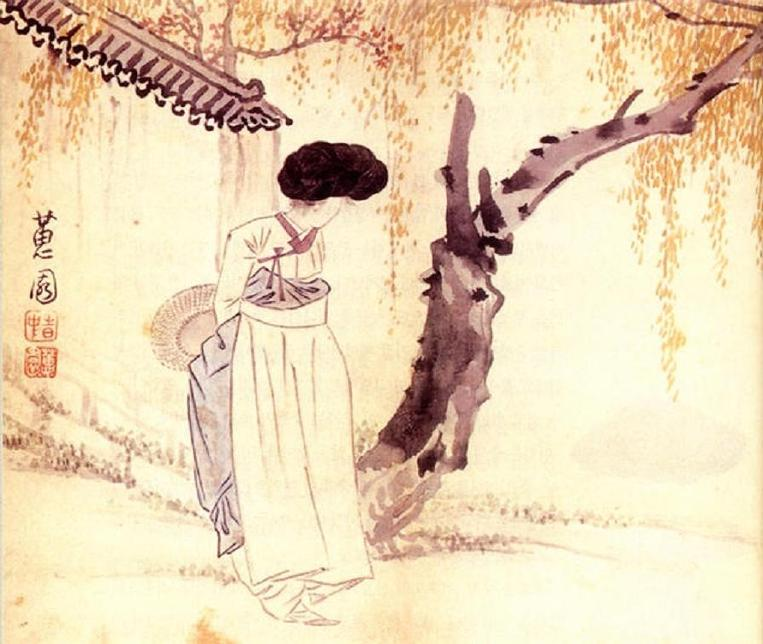
Shin Yun-bok Gidalim 기다림

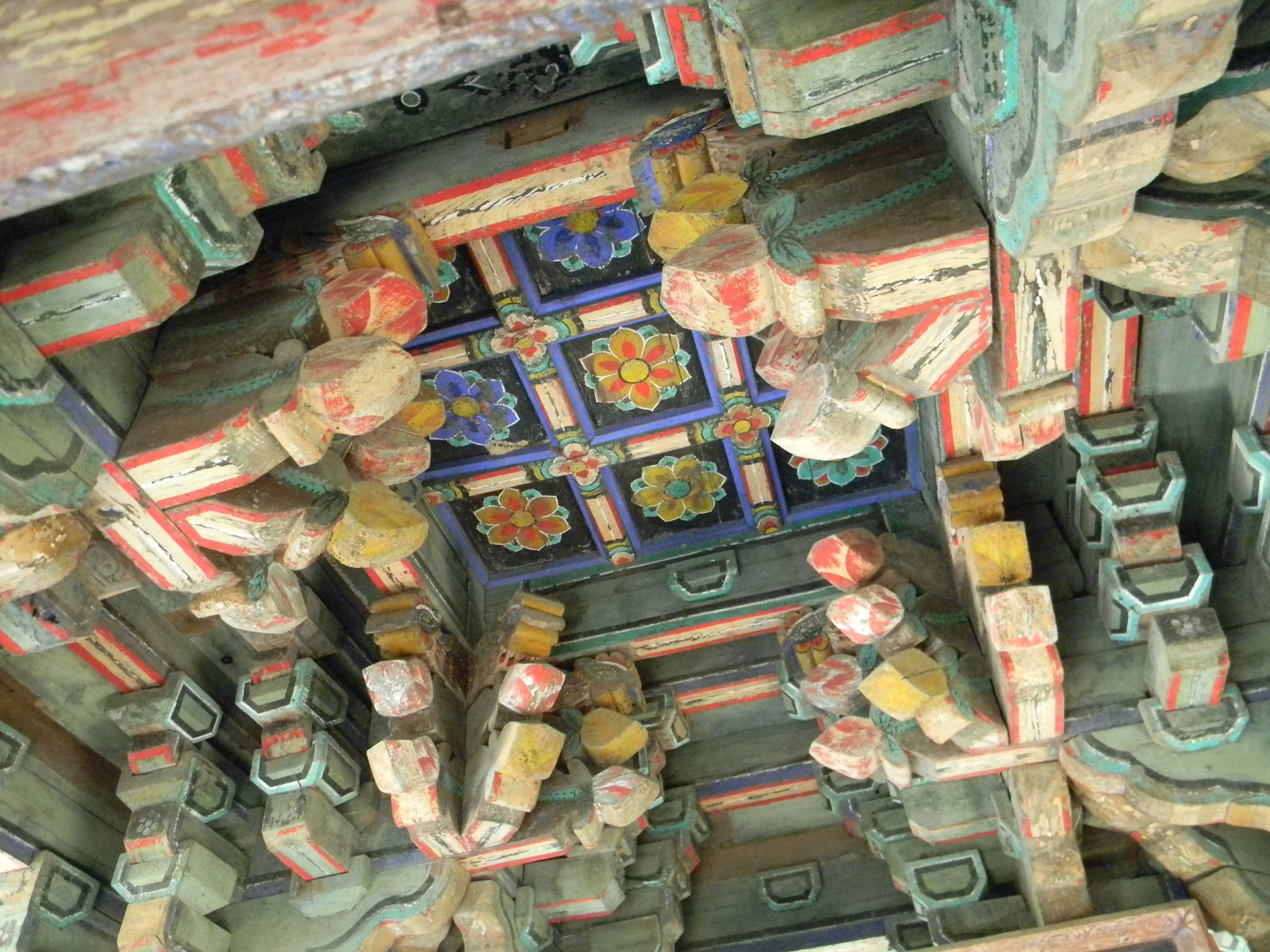
Dancheongsil-style painting

Hand crushing punishment [장파형수]

=== 군선도 (Painting of the nineteen immortals) E04 ===
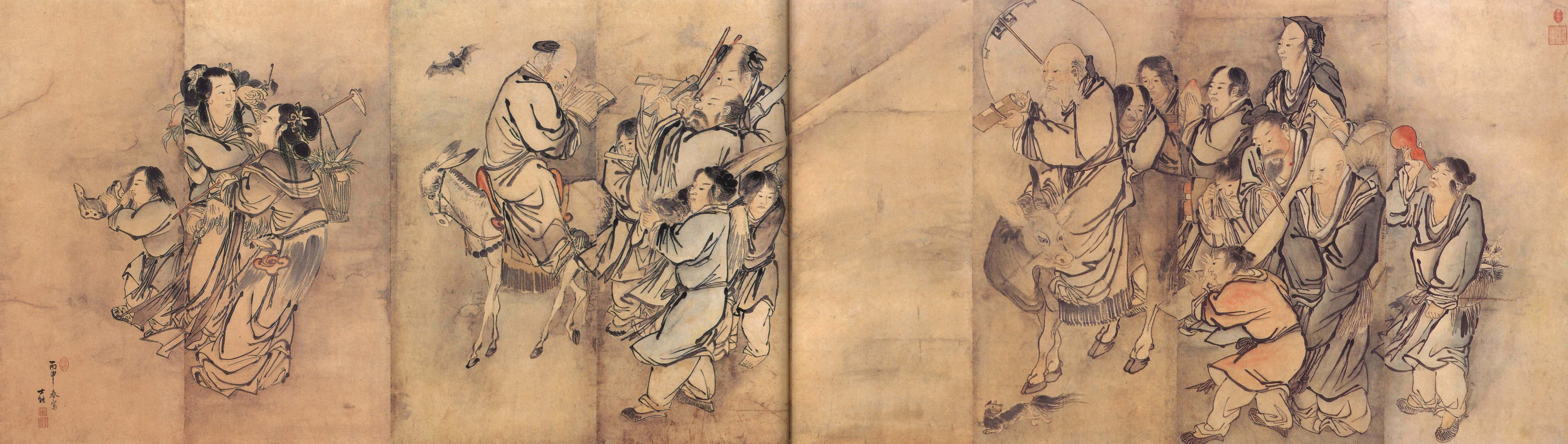
Kim Hong-do Gunseondo, 군선도, 1777

Painting of the nineteen immortals

=== 단오풍정 (Scenery on Dano day) E05 ===
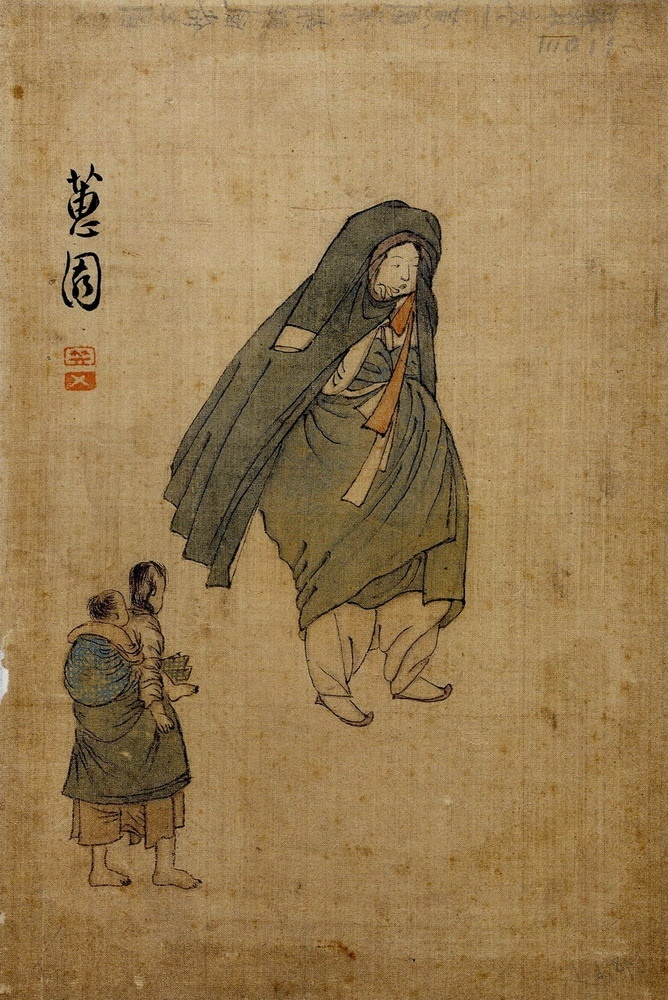
Hyewon yeosokdo
jangos.ibeun.yeoin
장옷 입은 여인
Don't recognize me !

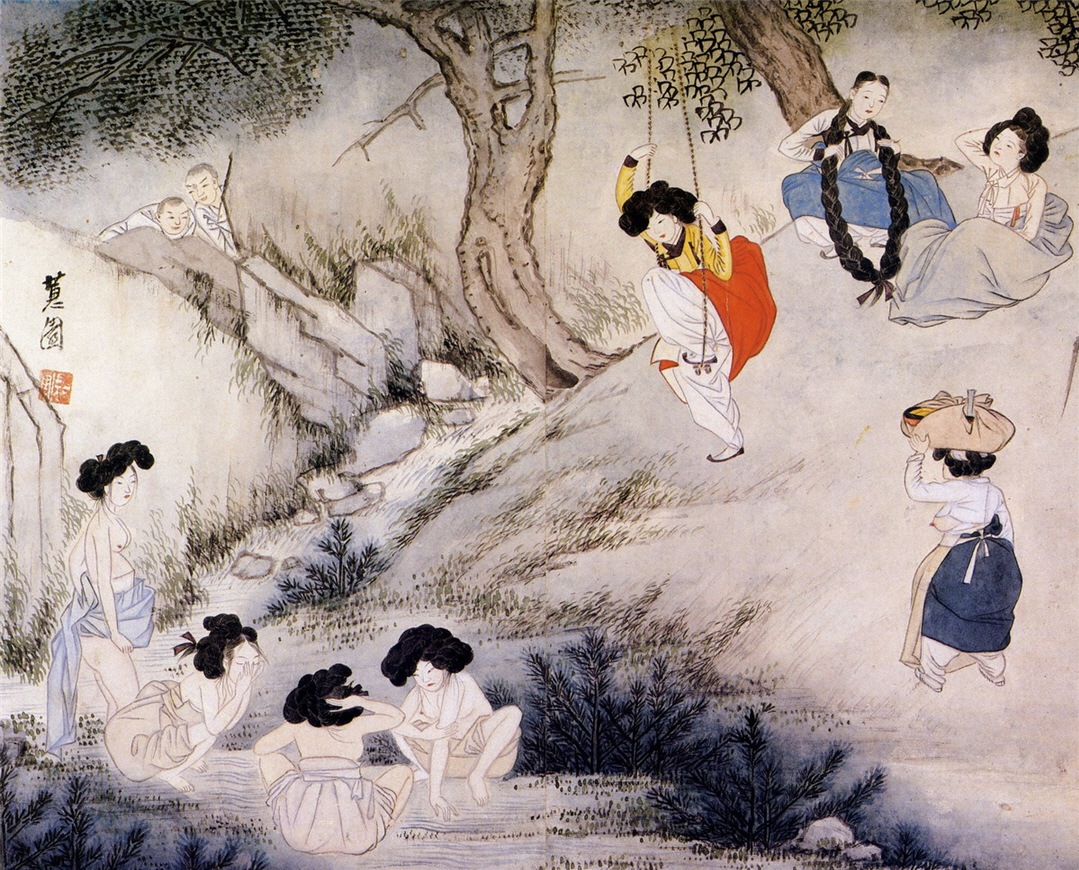
Hyewon pungsokdo
Dano.pungjeong
단오풍정
Scenery on Dano day

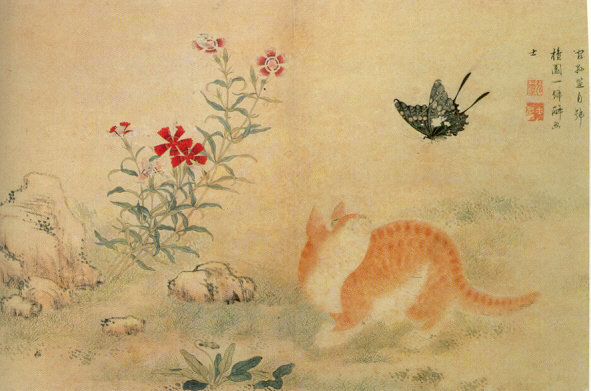
Kim Hong-do
Hwangmyo.nongjeop
황묘농접
Cat watching at a butterfly

Scenery on Dano day [단오풍정]

=== 동제각화 (One topic, two paintings) E06 ===
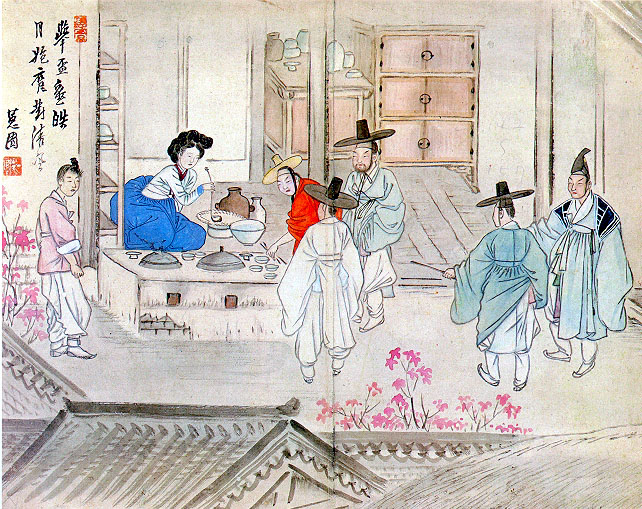
Hyewon pungsokdo
Jusa.geobae 주사거배
Pillars of the tavern

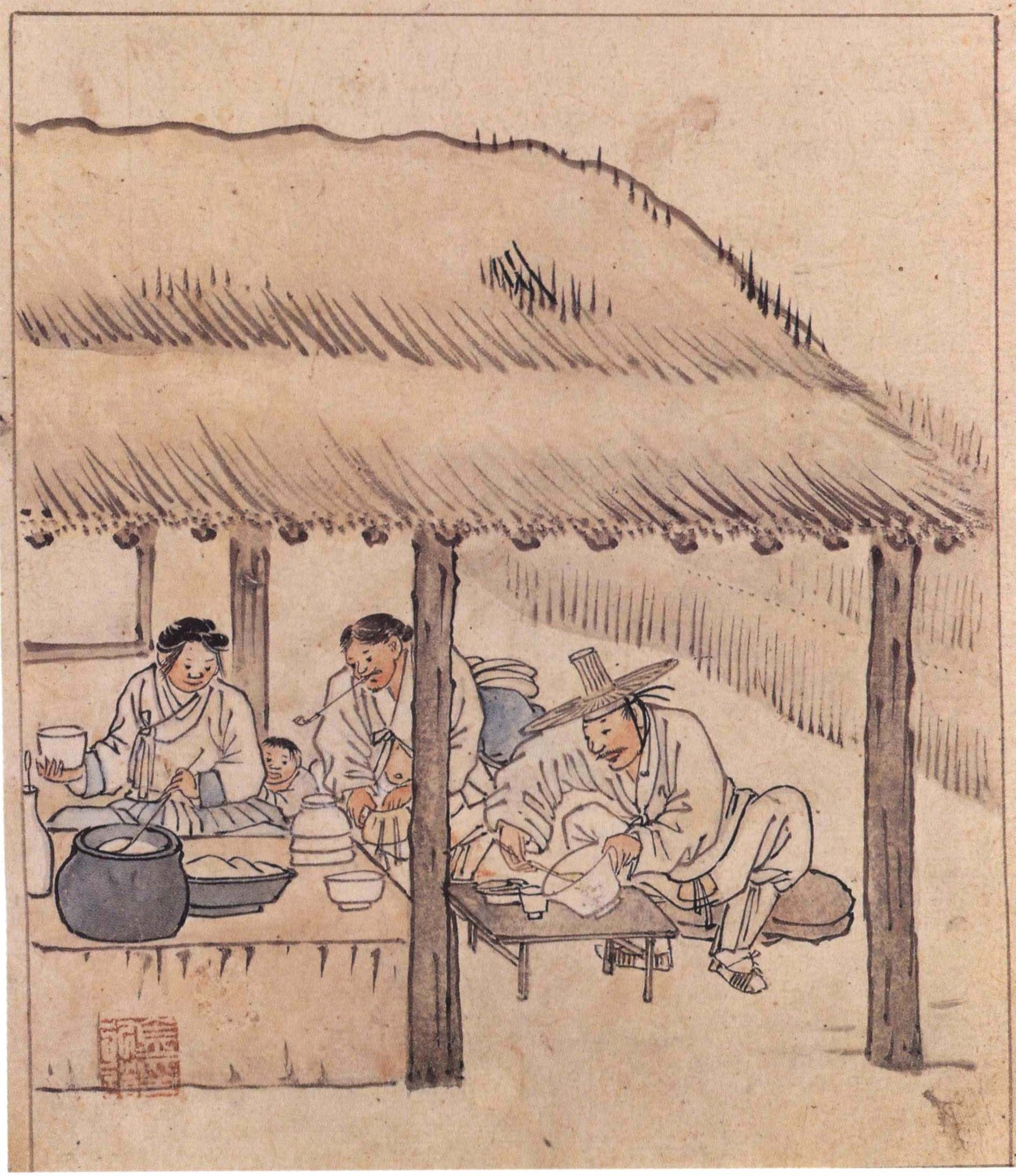
Danwon pungsokdo
Jumak 주막
People at the tavern

One topic, two paintings [동제각화]

=== 정풍 (Gathering evidences) E07 ===
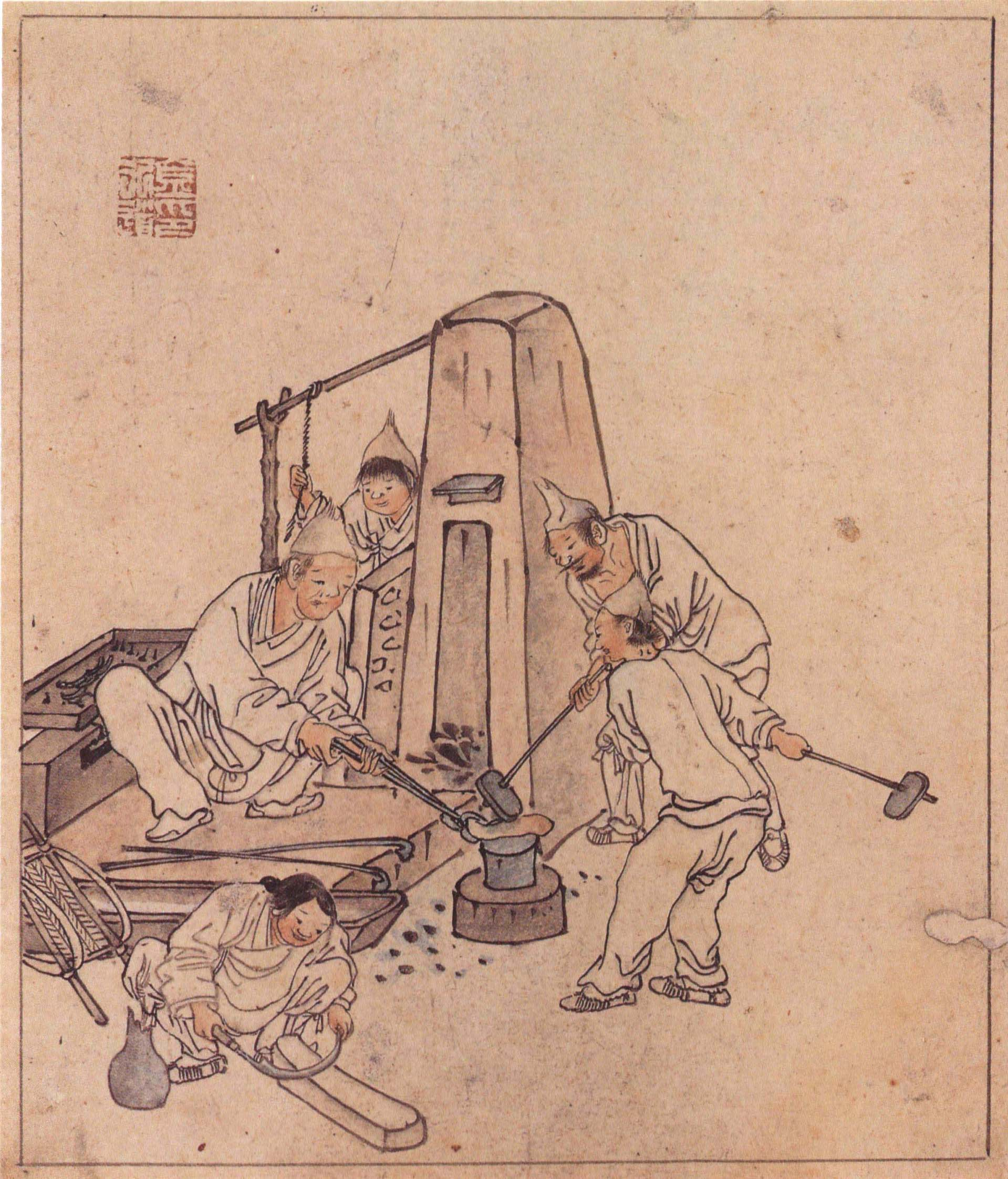
Danwon pungsokdo
Daejanggan 대장간
Iron Smiths

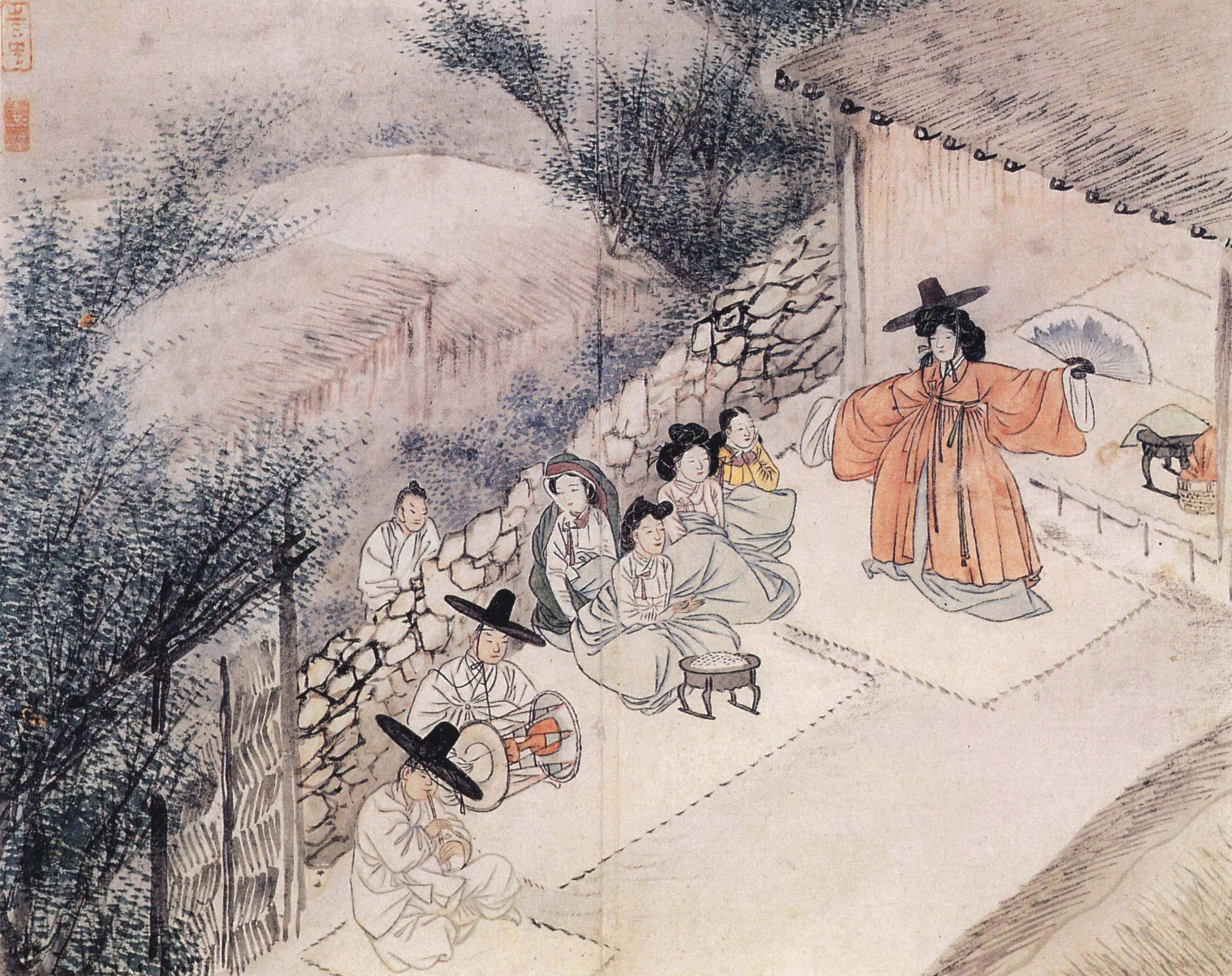
Hyewon pungsokdo
Munyeo.sinmu 무녀신무
Dance of a Shaman

Gathering evidences [정풍]

=== 어진화사 1 (Imperial Master Painter) E08 ===
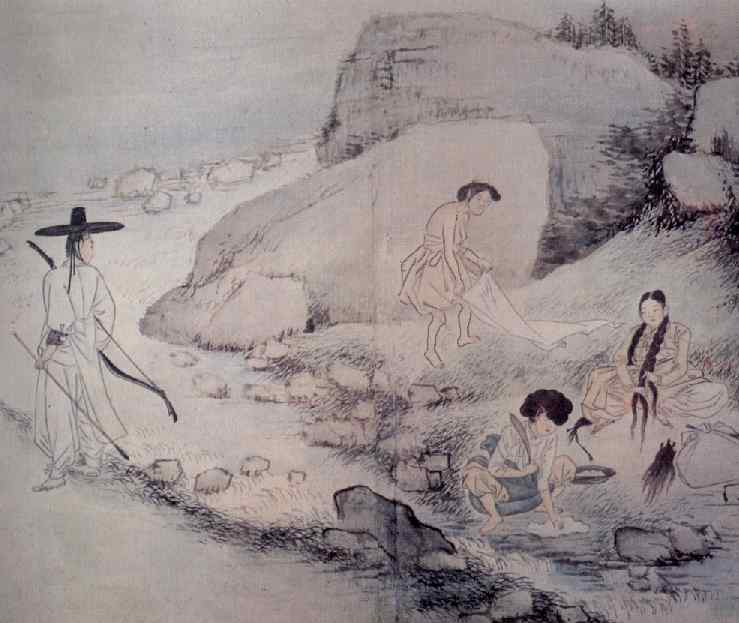
Hyewon pungsokdo
Gyebeon.gahwa 계변가화
A story of a street by a stream

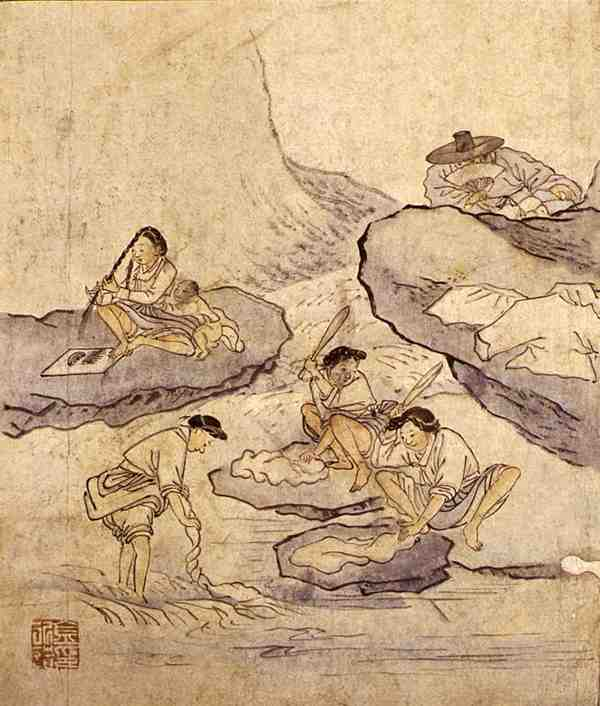
Danwon pungsokdo
Bbalrae.teo 빨래터
A laundry place

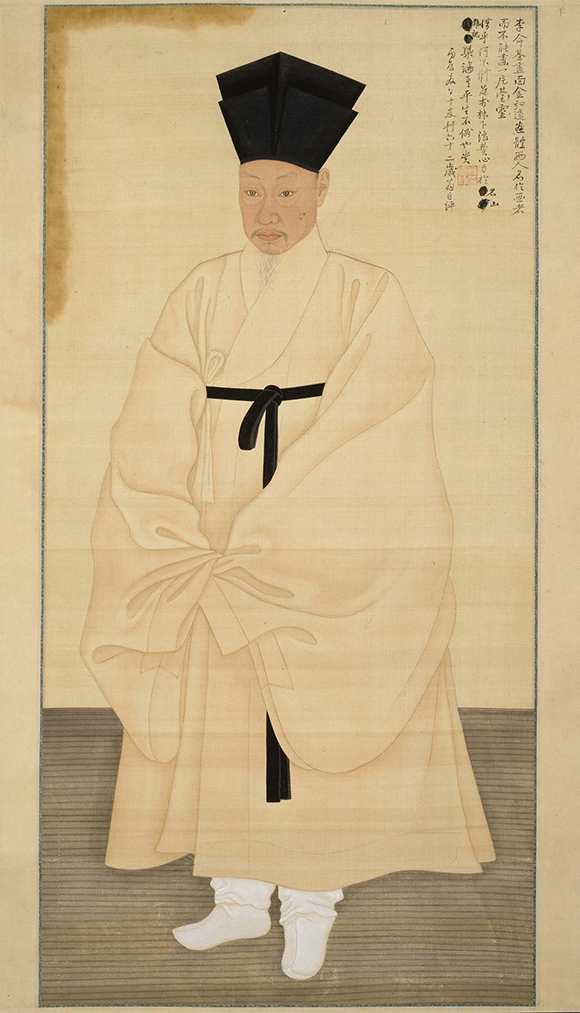
Yi Myeong-gi, Kim Hong-do
서직수 초상
Portrait of Seo Jik-su (1796)

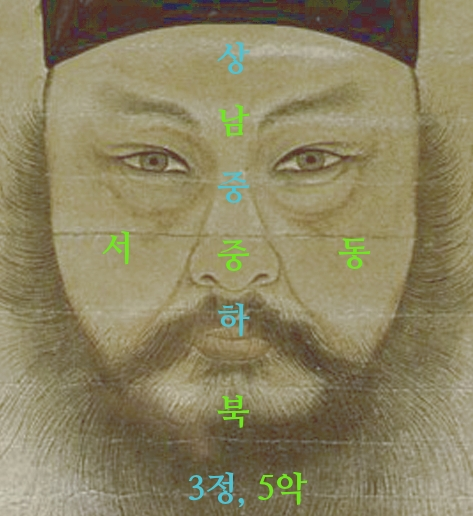
Self portrait of Yun Du-seo (1668–1715)
윤두서 자화상
Three Jeongs, Five Aks

Imperial Master Painter [어진화사 1]

=== 어진화사 2 (Imperial Master Painter) E09 ===
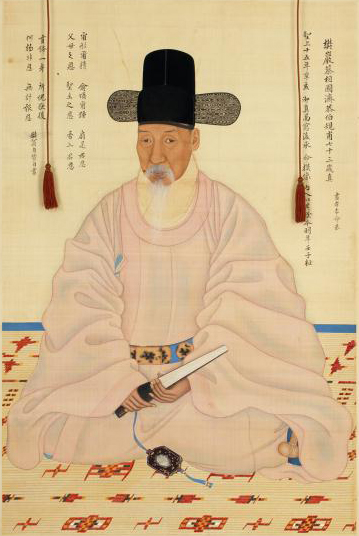
Yi Myeong-gi
채제공의 초상화
Portrait of Chae Je-gong (1792)

Imperial Master Painter [어진화사 2]

=== 어진화사 3 (Imperial Master Painter) E10 ===
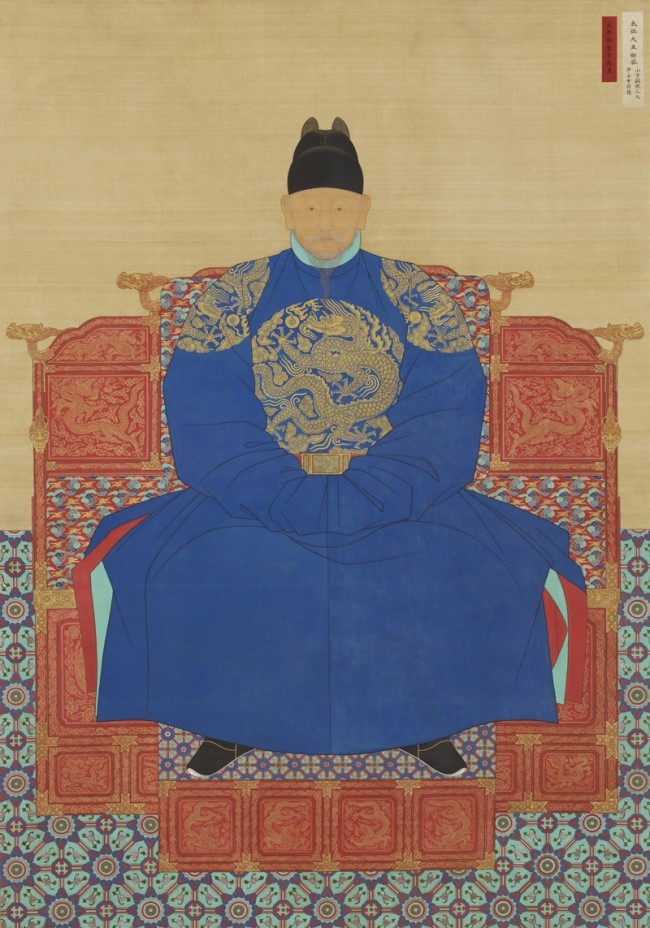
Various artists (1872)
Taejo Eojin 태조 어진
Retrospective Portrait of King Taejo

Imperial Master Painter [어진화사 3]

=== 어진화사 4 (Imperial Master Painter) E11 ===
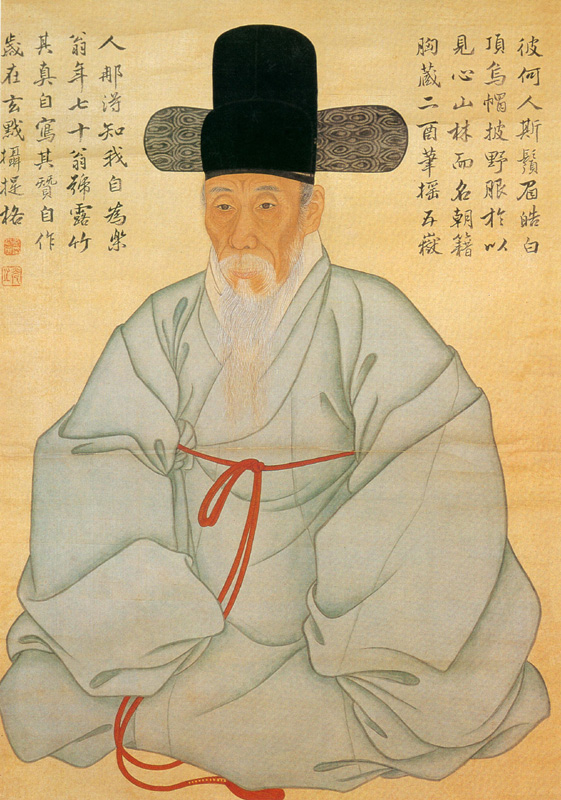
Gang Se-hwang (1713–1791)
강세황의 자화상
Self Portrait (1784)

Imperial Master Painter [어진화사 4]

=== 봉심 (Bongsim Evaluation) E12 ===

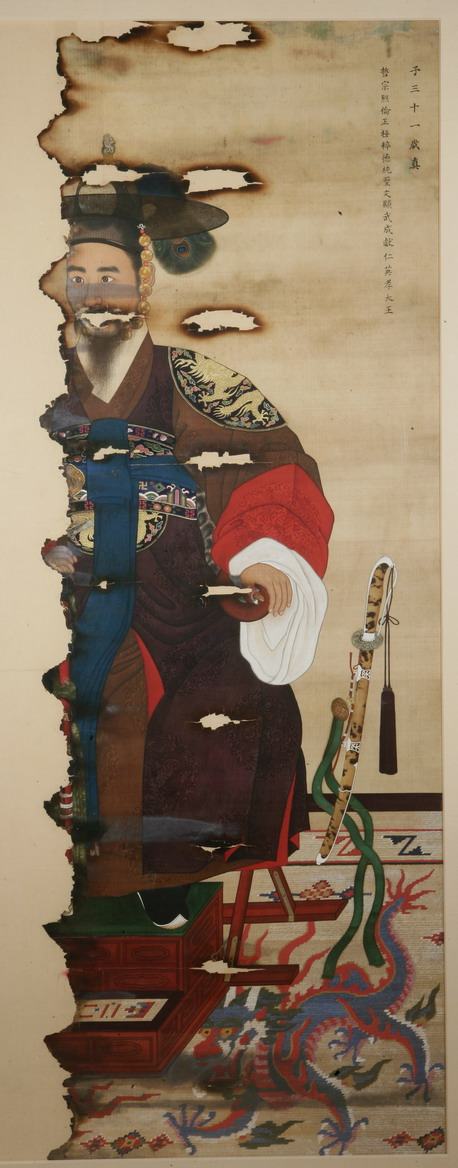
(1862)
Portrait of King Cheoljong

Bongsim Evaluation [봉심]

=== 생과 사 (Life and Death) E13 ===

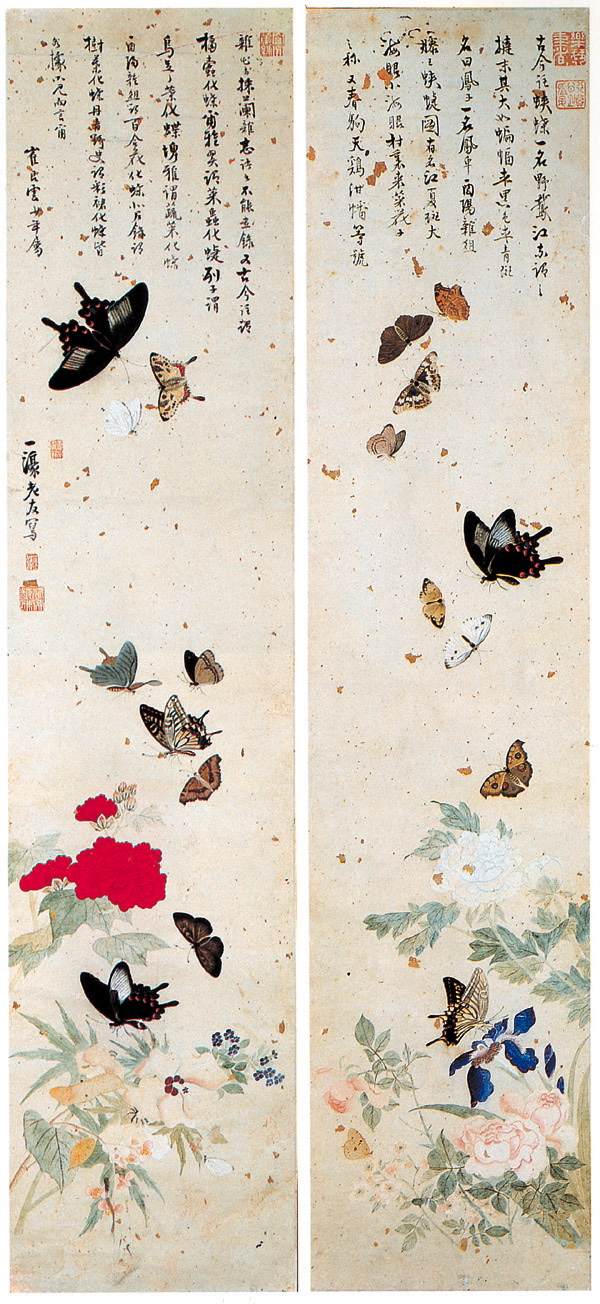
Nam Gye-u (1811-88)
남계우 - 군접도
Butterflies

Life and Death [생과사]

=== 잃어버린 예진 (Searching for the Lost Yejin) E14 ===
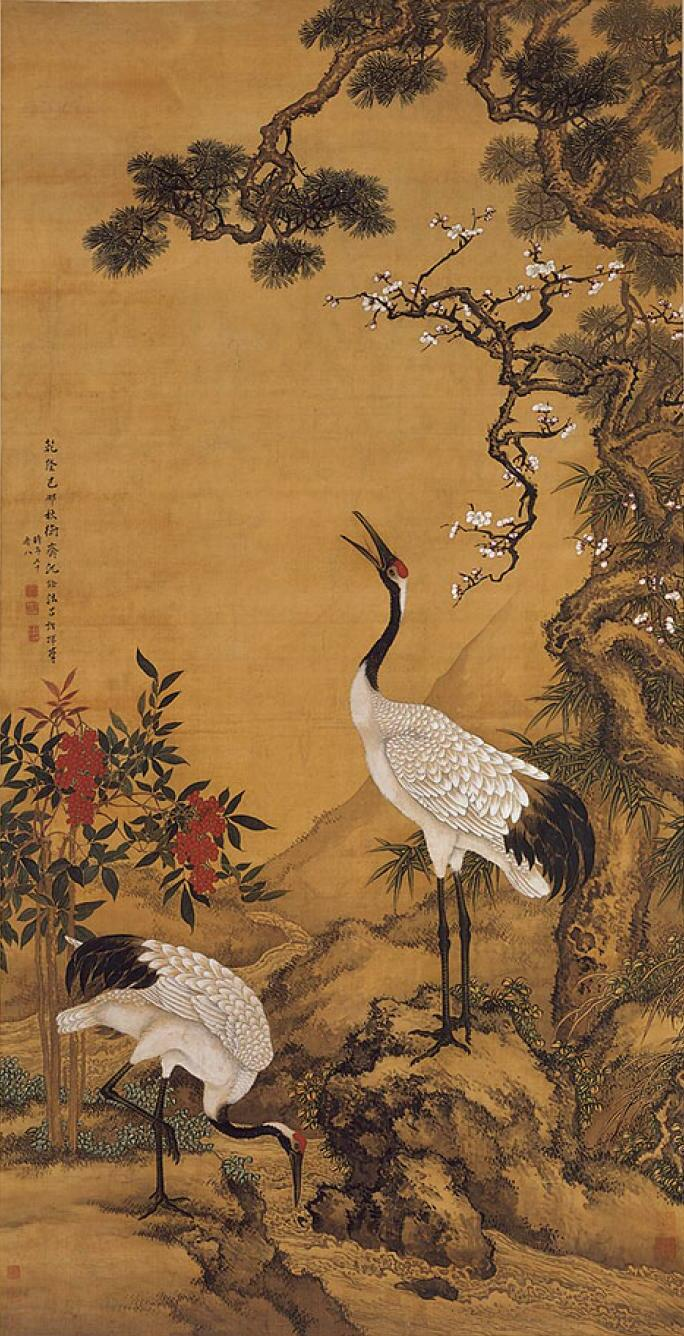
Shen Quan (1682–1760)
Pine, Plum and Cranes
(1759)

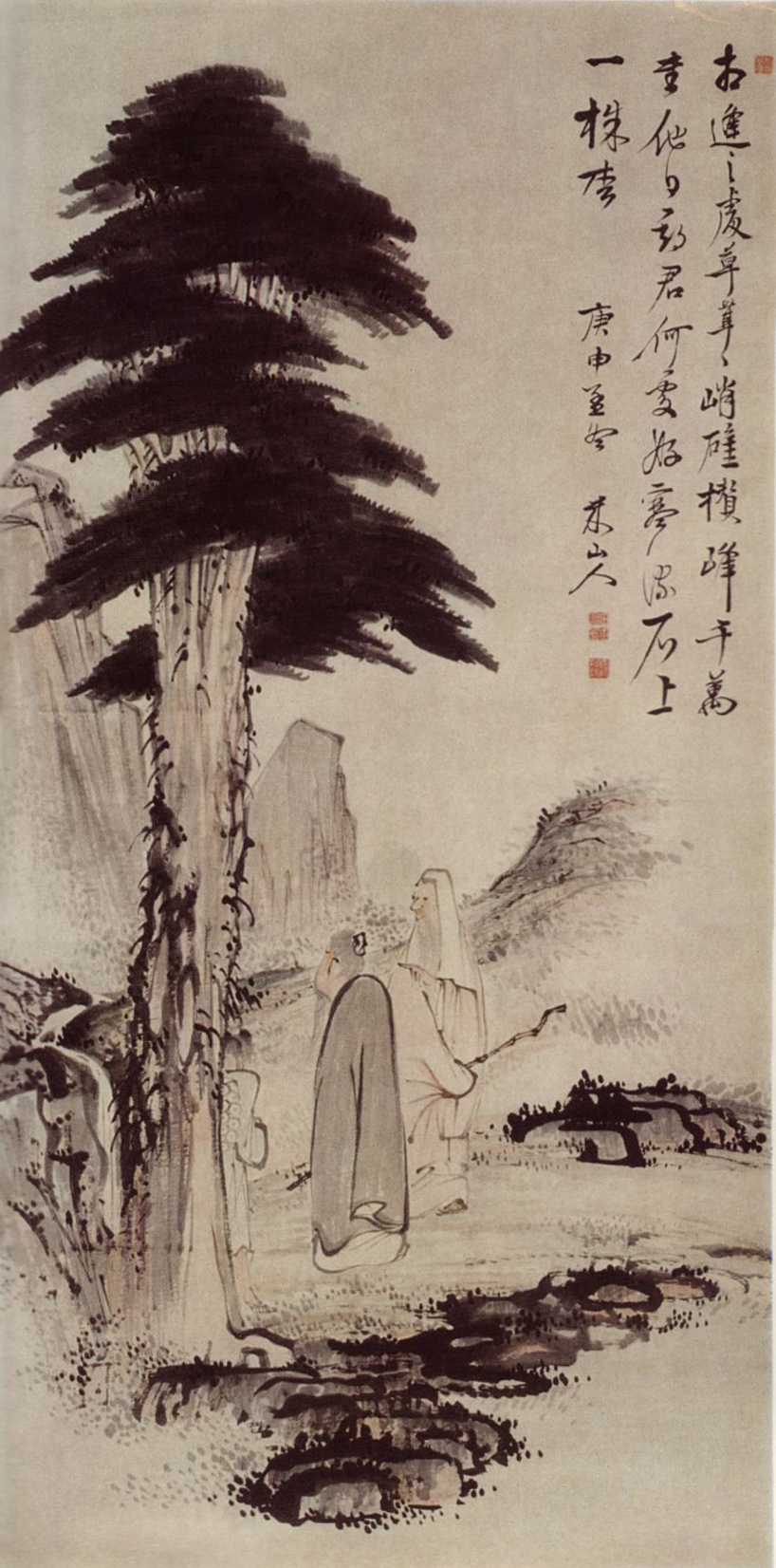
Okada Beisanjin (1744–1820)
Scholars under a Tree

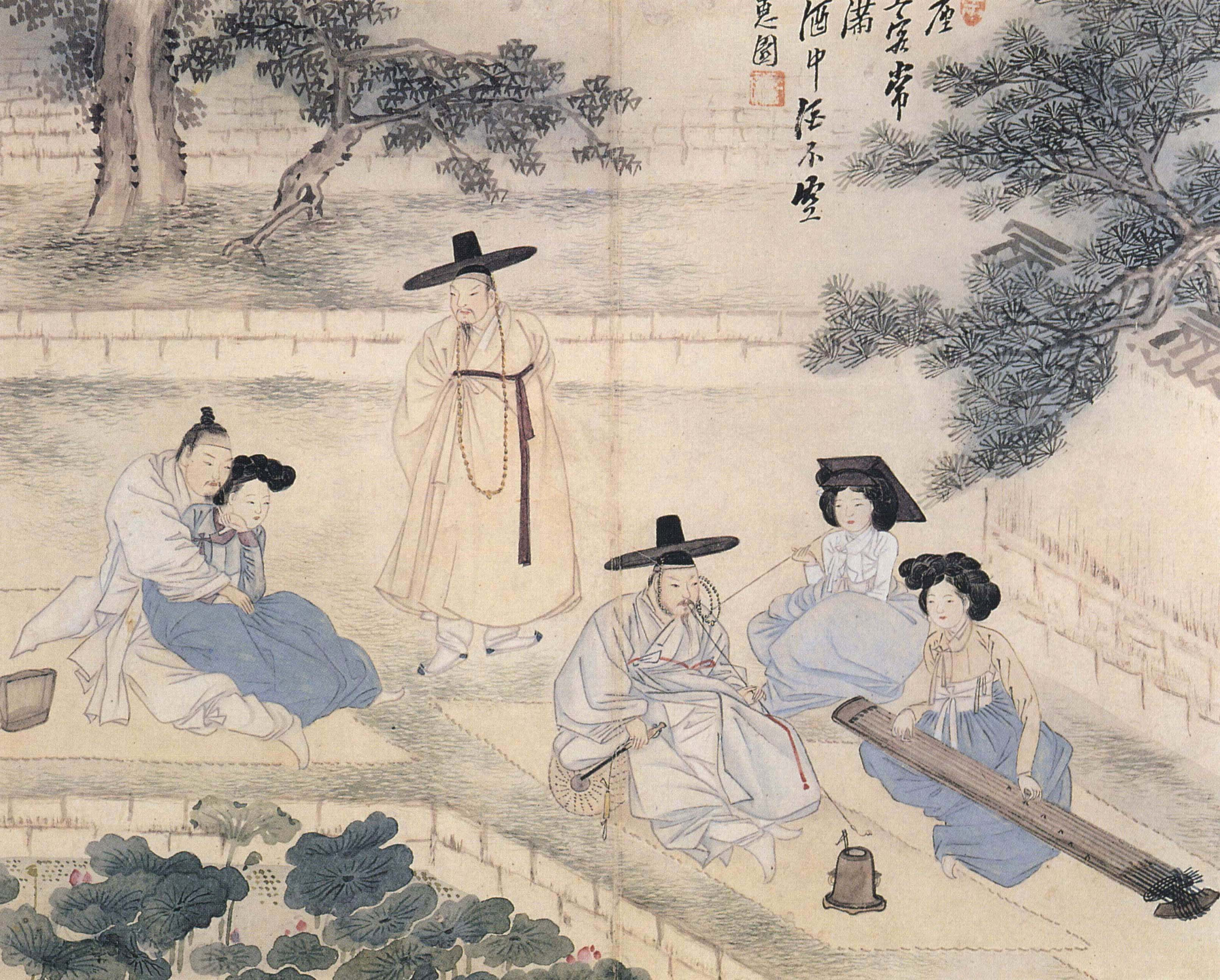
Hyewon pungsokdo
Cheonggeum.sangryeon 청금상련
Geomungo music, lotus fragrance

Searching for the Lost Yejin [잃어버린 예진]

=== 다섯개의 초상 (Portraits of the Five Bamboos) E15 ===
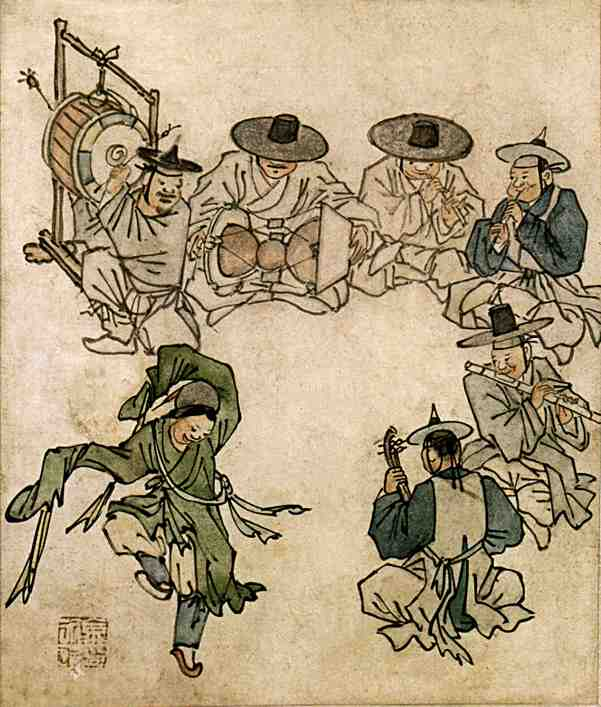
Danwon Pungsokdo
Mudong 무동
Dancing boy

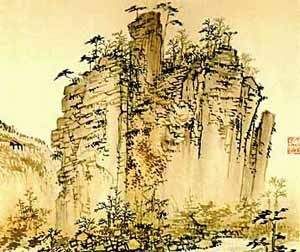
Kim Hong-do
Sansuhwa 김홍도 - 산수화
Mountains

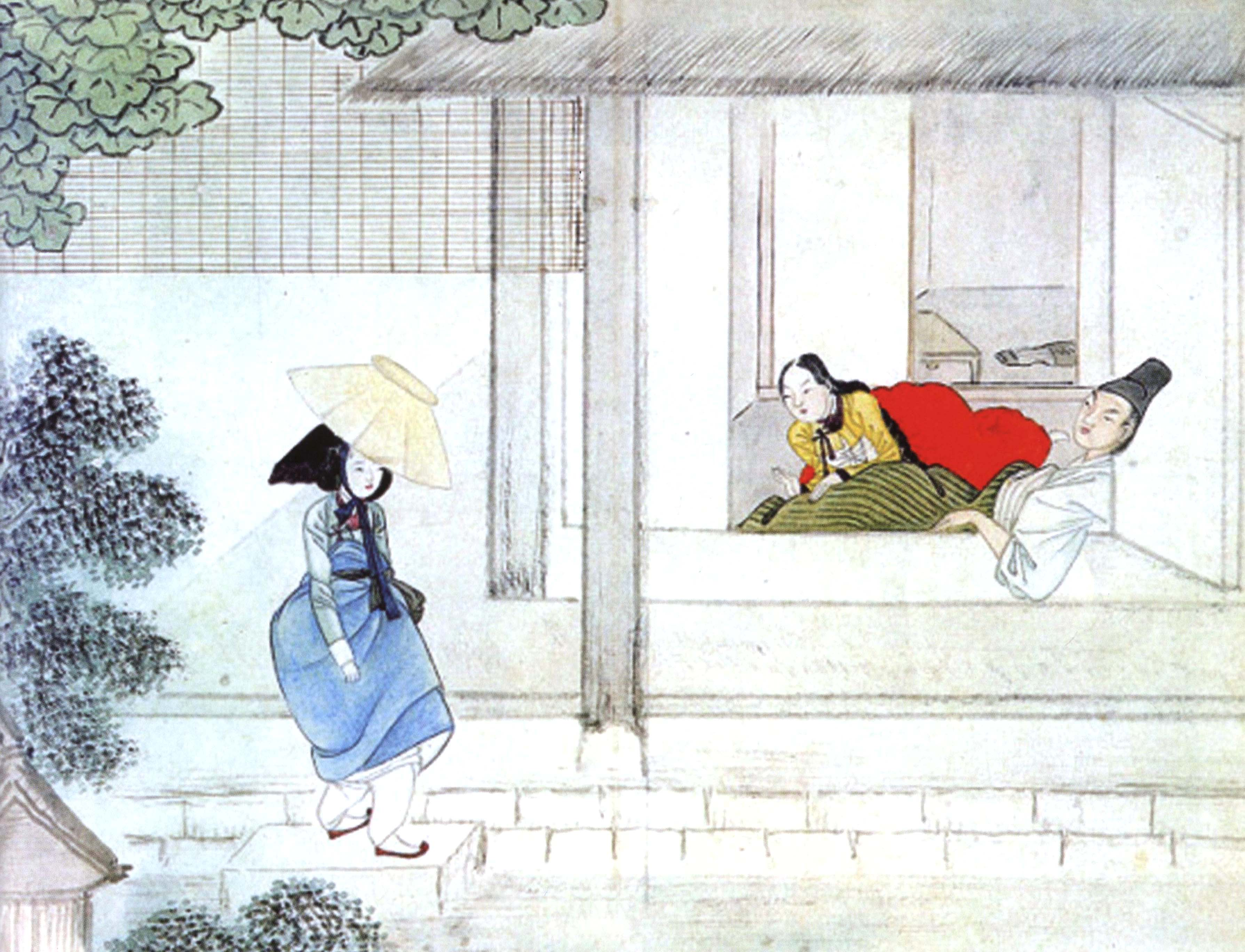
Hyewon pungsokdo
Gibang.musa 기방무사
Warrior at rest

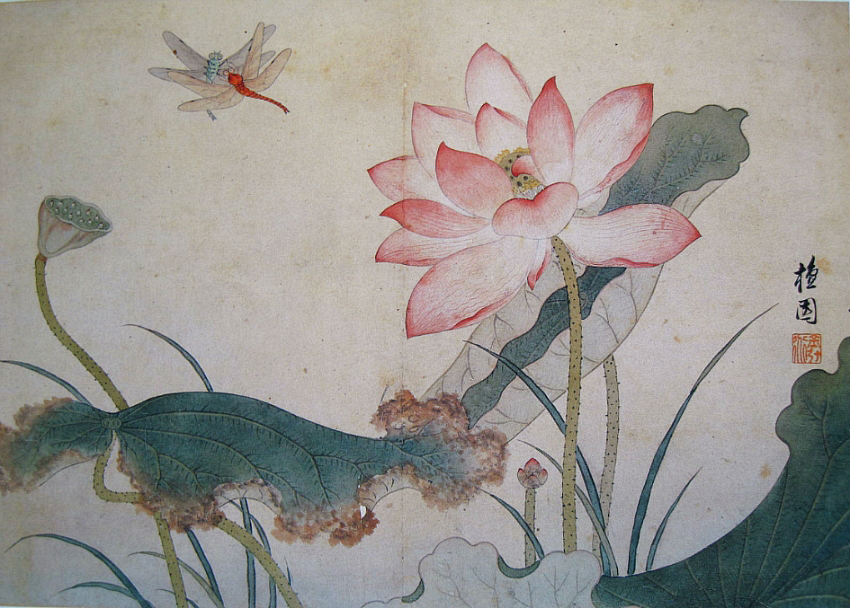
Kim Hong-do
Hahwa-Cheongjeong 하화청정도
Lotus and dragonflies

Portraits of the Five Bamboos [다섯개의 초상]

=== 얼굴없는 초상 (The Faceless Portrait) E16 ===
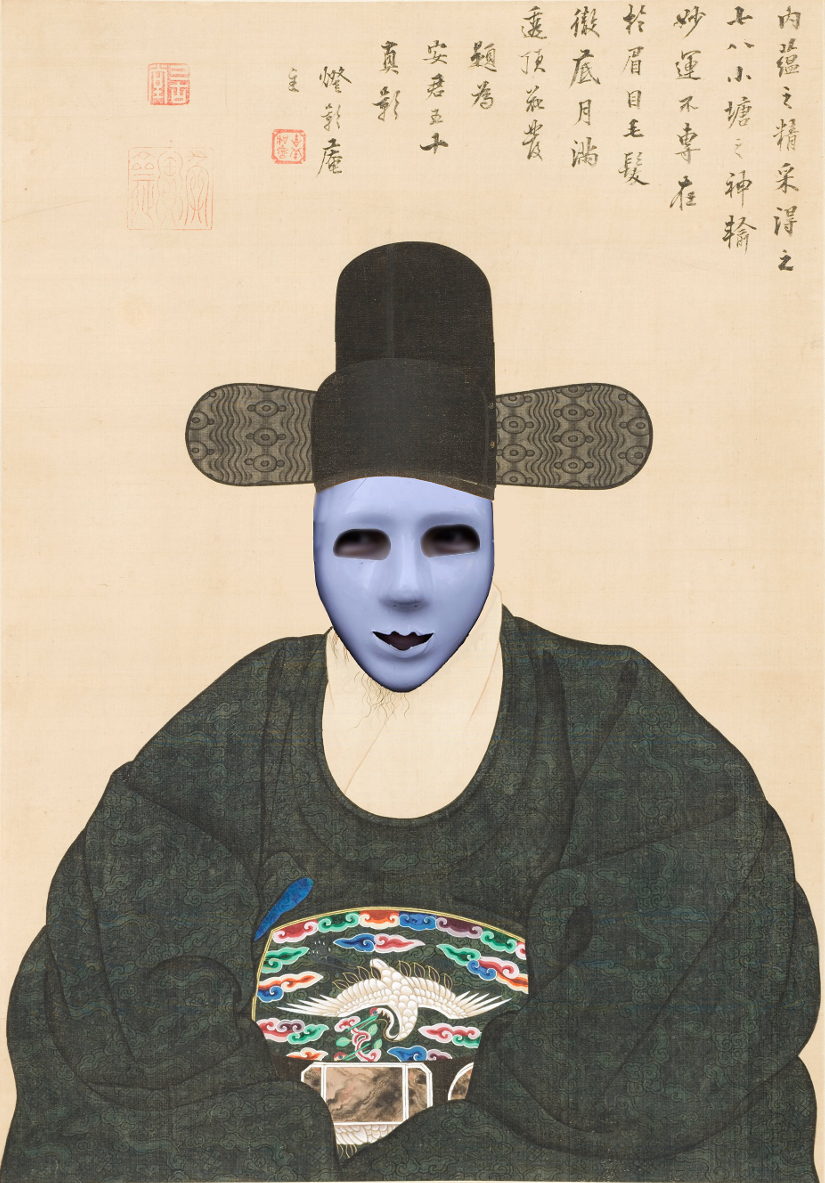
Faceless Portrait
(courtesy of Yi Jaegwan)

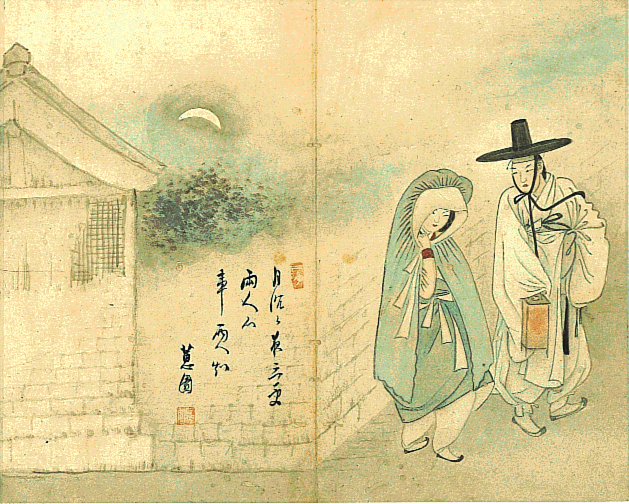
Hyewon pungsokdo, Weolha.jeongin 월하정인
Lovers under the moonlight

In the middle of the night,
When the moon is dark,
The two hearts are one.

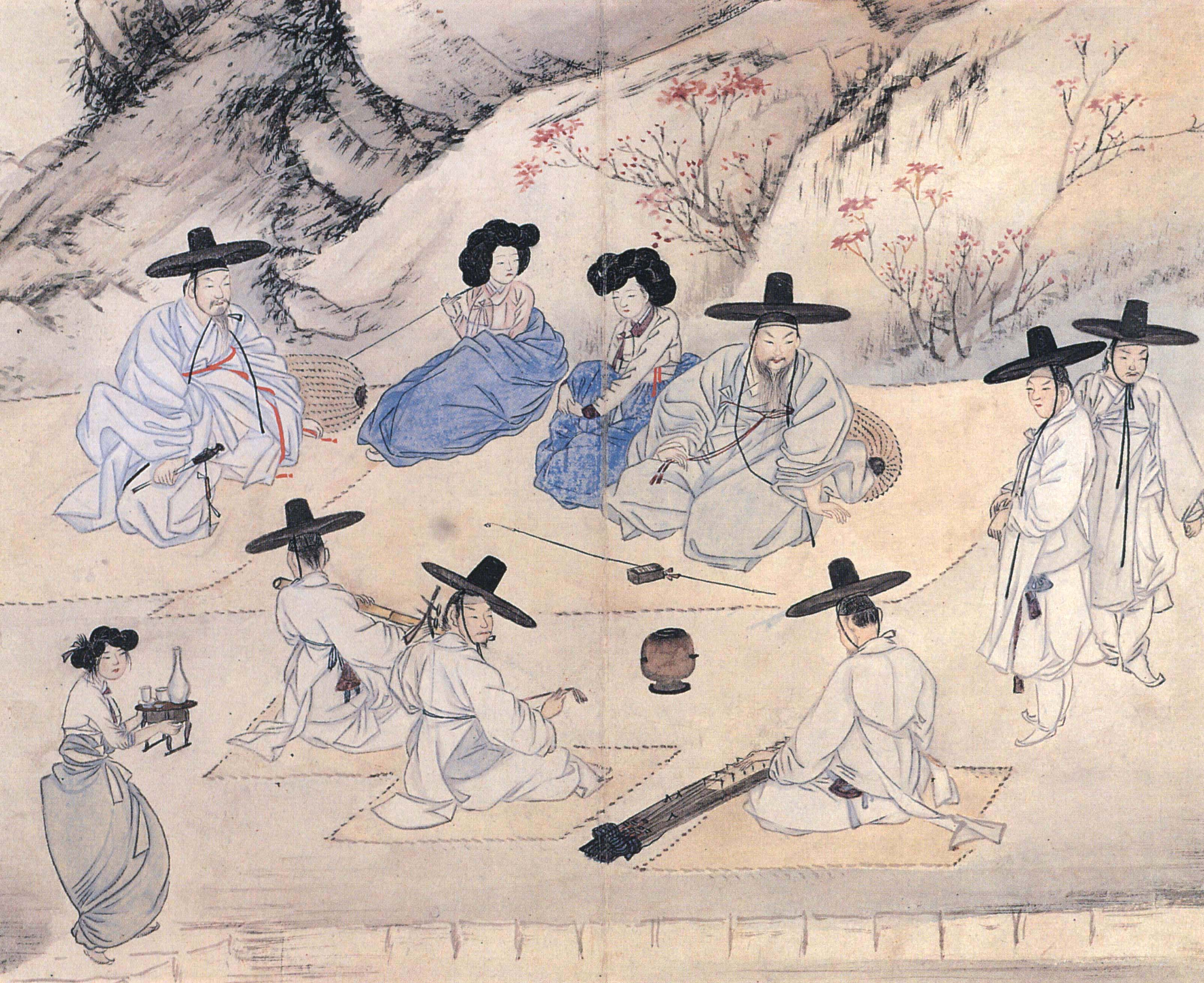
Hyewon pungsokdo
Sangchun.yaheung 상춘야흥
Amusing Spring Day

The Faceless portrait [얼굴없는 초상]

=== 십년전 여인 (The Girl from Ten Years Before) E17 ===
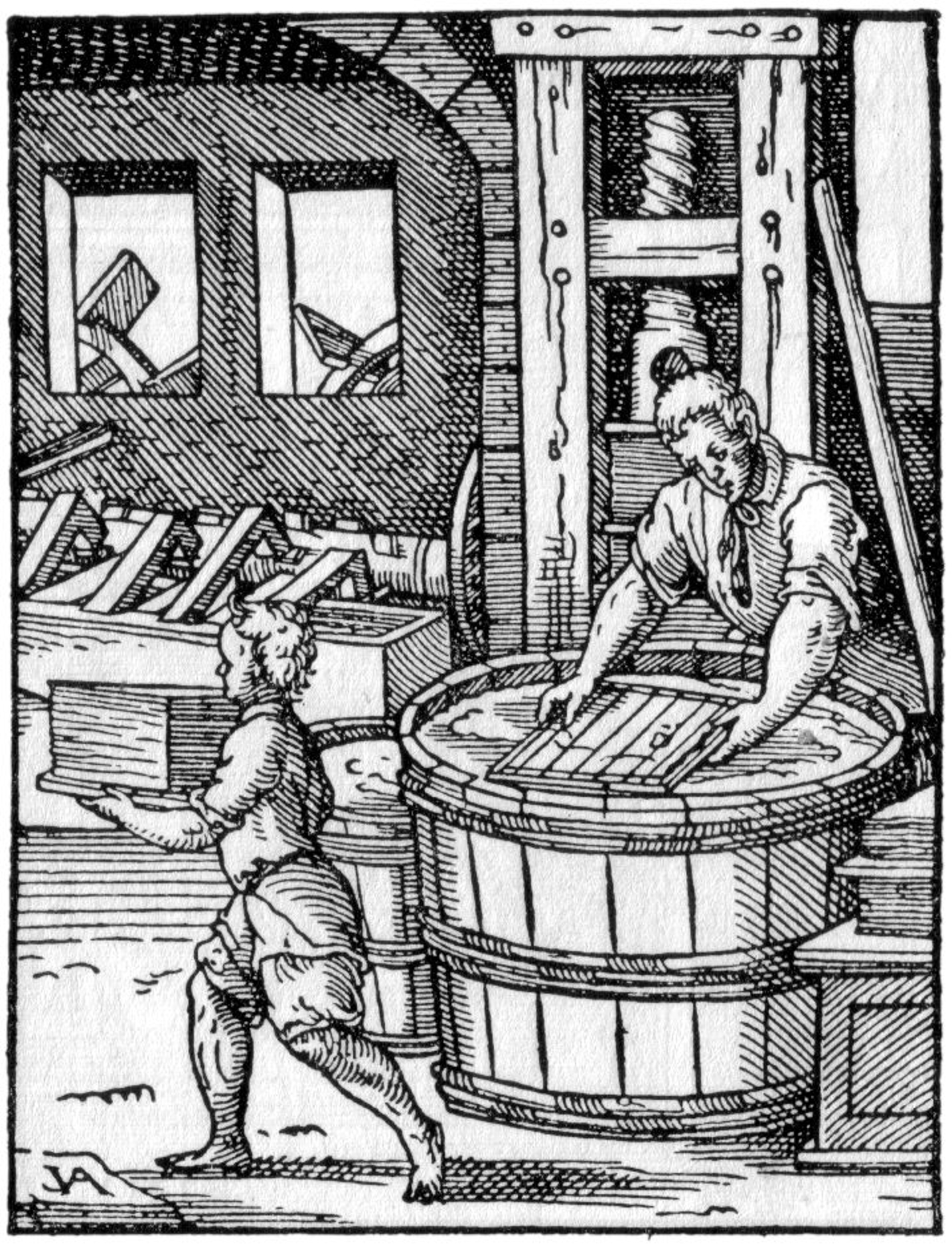
Jost Amman (1539–1591)
"Das Ständebuch (1568)".
Paper making

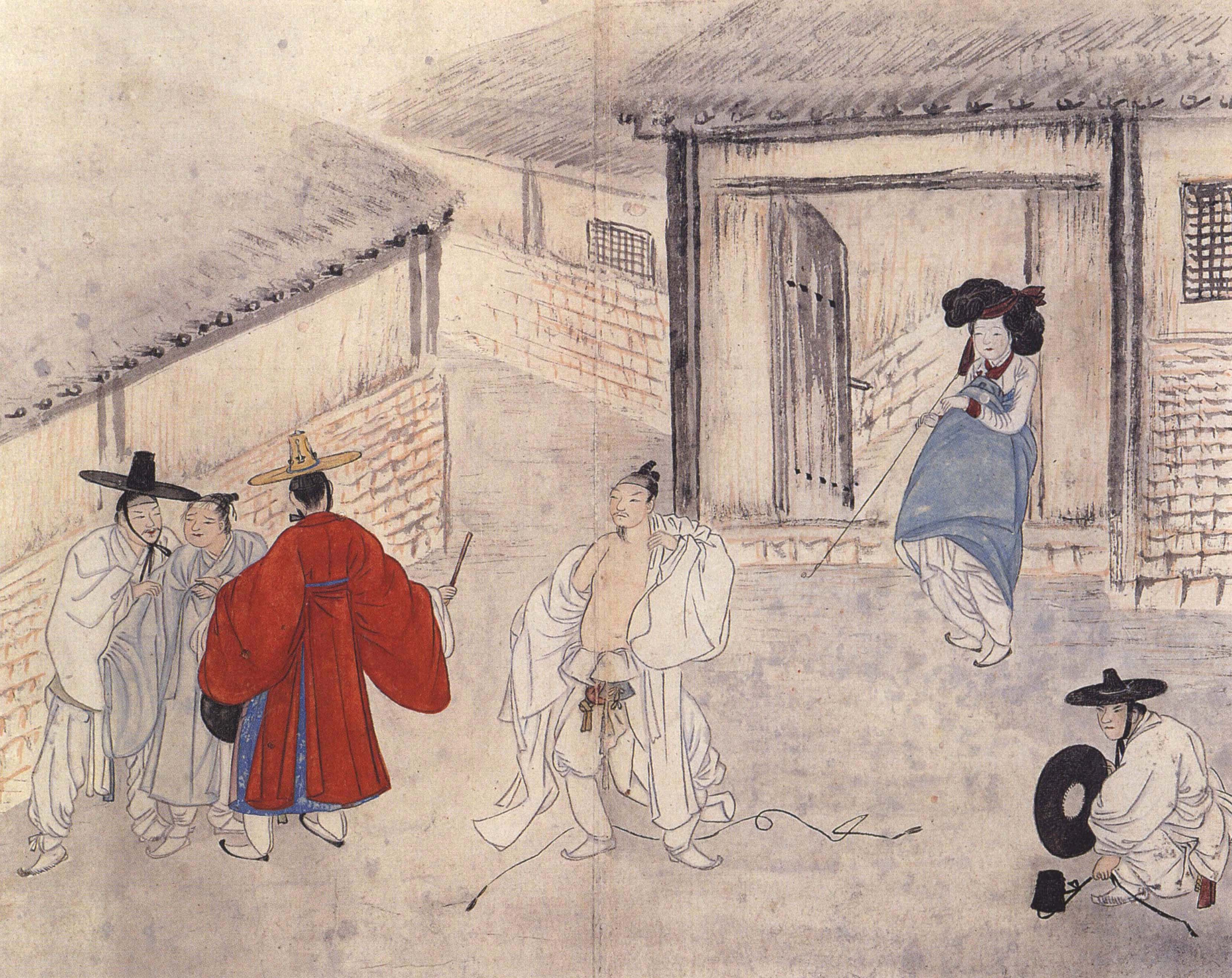
Hyewon pungsokdo
Yugwak.jaengung 유곽쟁웅
Hero at the Brothel

The Girl from Ten Years Before [십년전 여인]

=== 원수 (Enemies) E18 ===
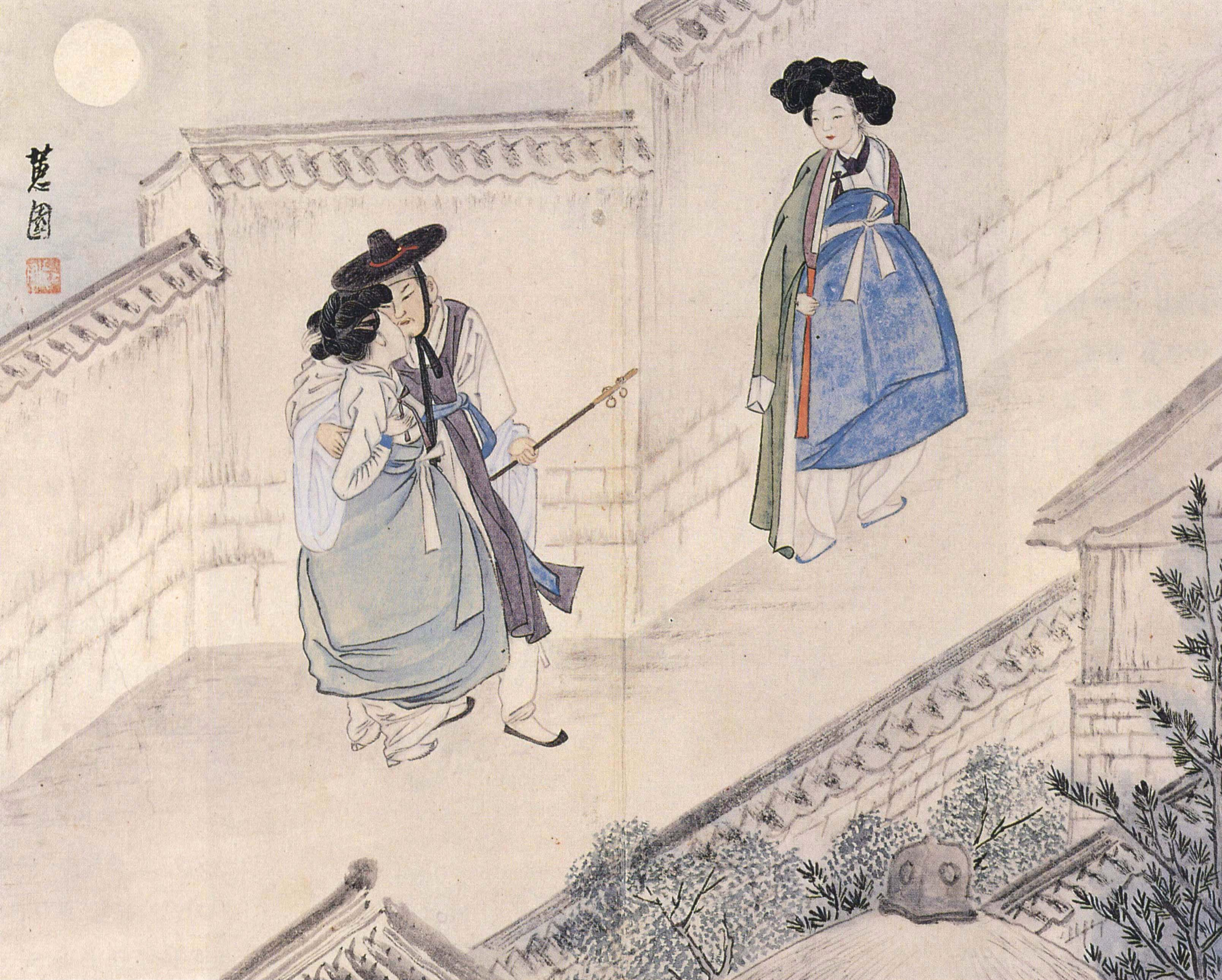
Hyewon pungsokdo
Weolha.milhoe 월야밀회
Secret affair under the moon

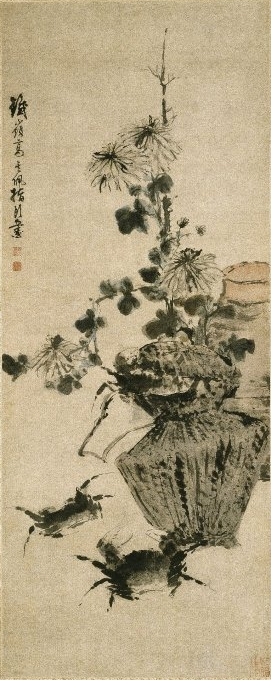
Gao Qipei (1672–1734)
Crabs and Chrysanthemums

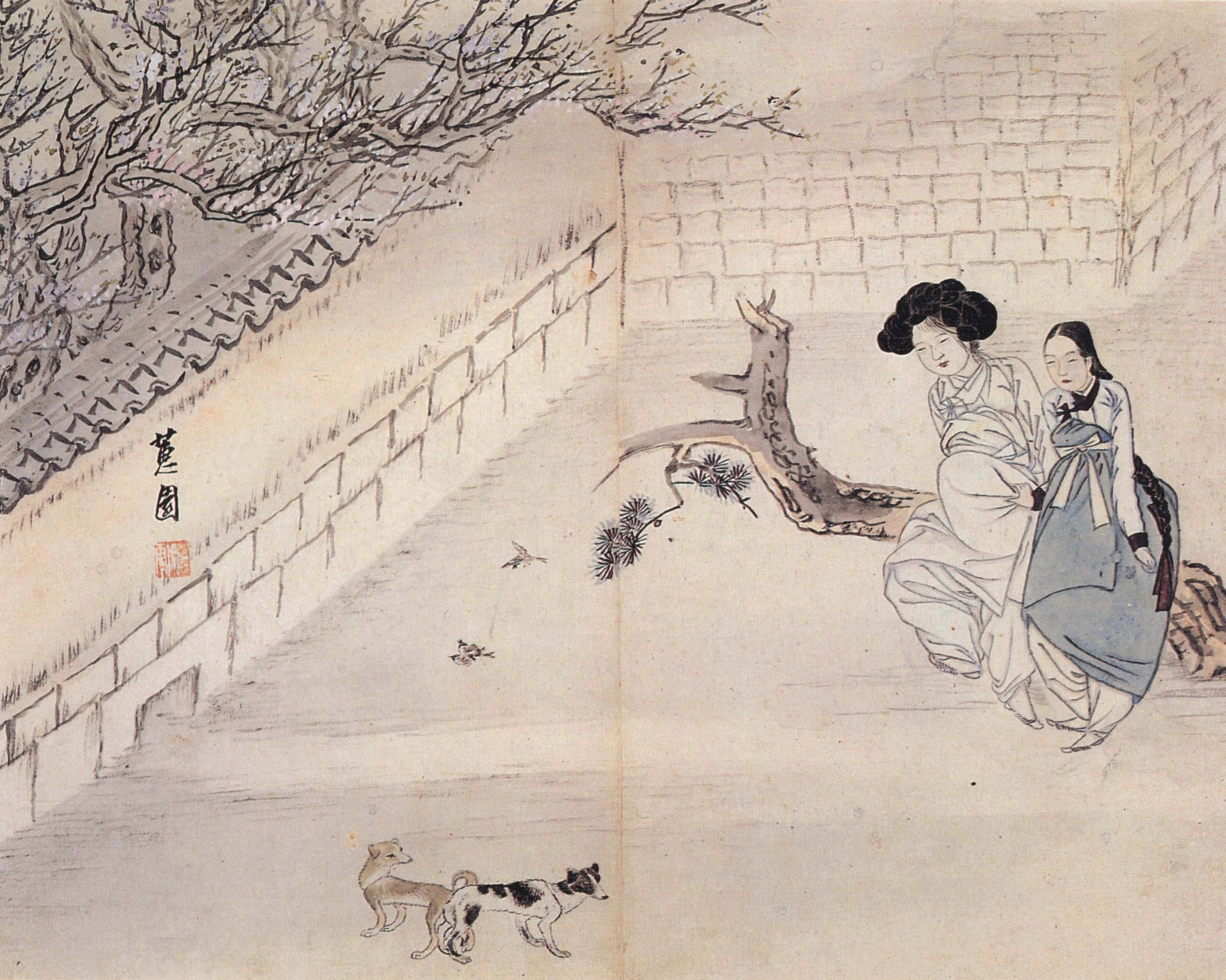
Hyewon pungsokdo
Ibu.tamchun 이부탐춘
Mistress indulges in Spring

Enemies [원수]

=== 쟁투 (Fight) E19 ===
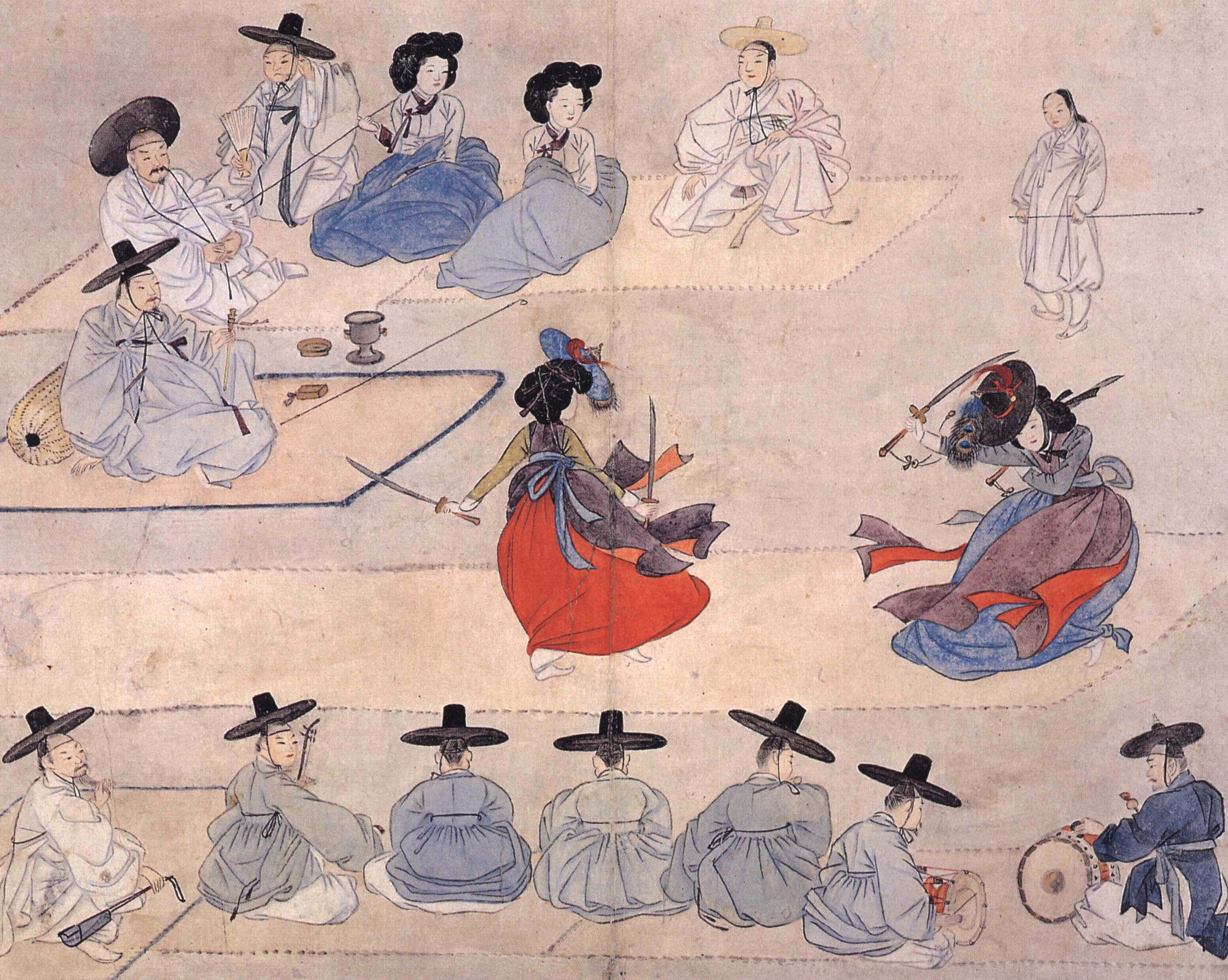
Hyewon pungsokdo
Ssanggeom.daemu 쌍검대무
Double Swords Dancing

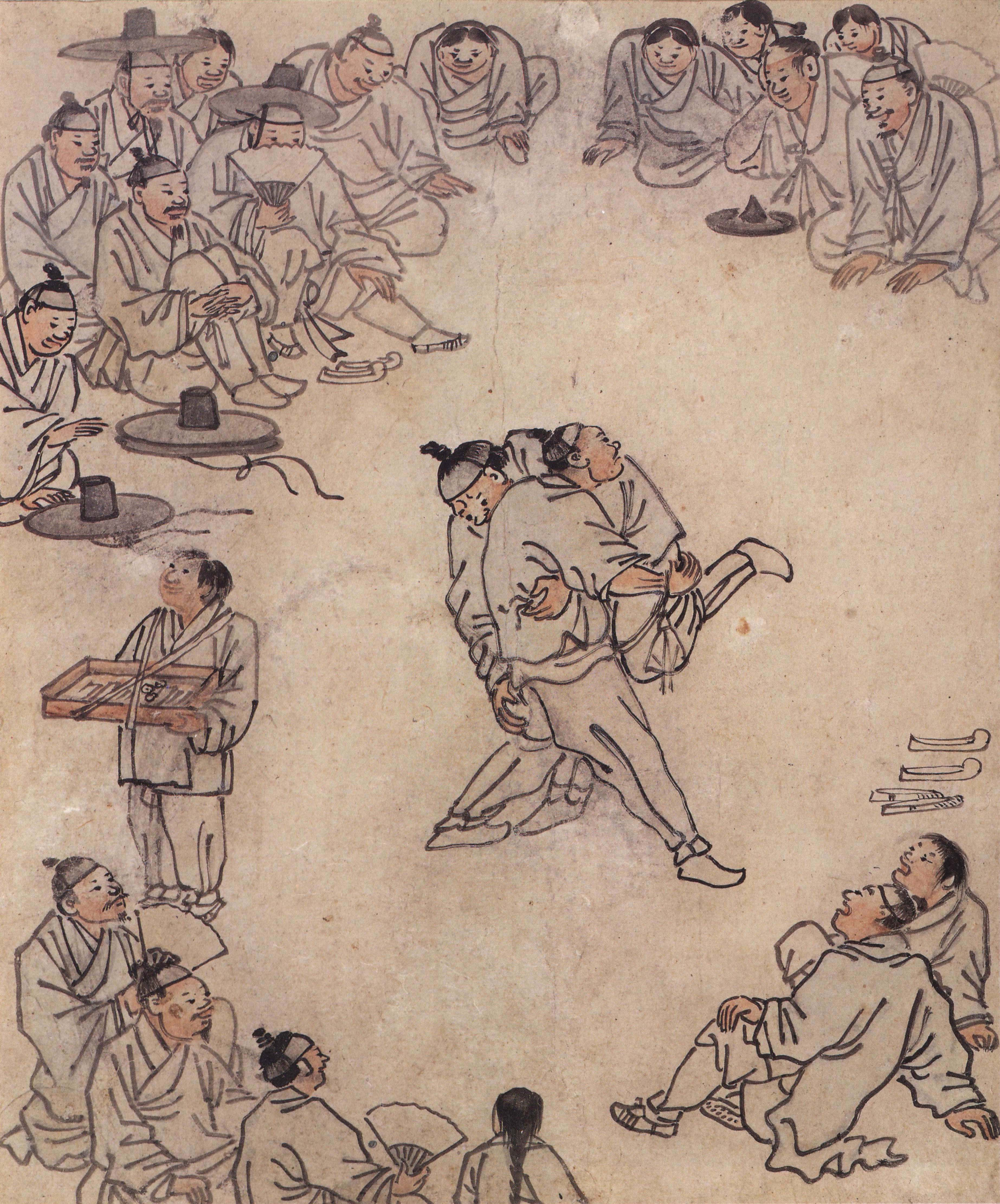
Danwon pungsokdo
Ssireum 씨름
Wrestling

Fight [쟁투]

=== 미인도 (Portrait of a Beauty) E20 ===

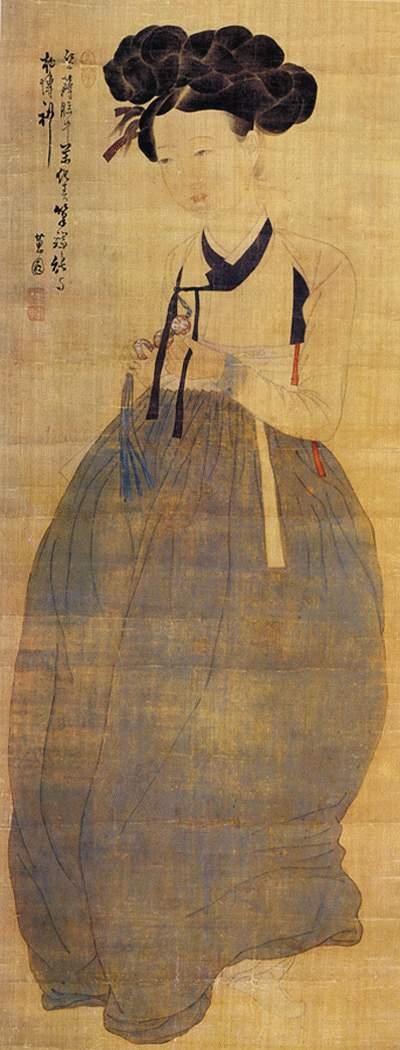
Shin Yun-bok
Miindo 미인도
Portrait of a Beauty

A painting meaning,
wouldn't that be of
yearning and longing for?
