= Sun Hwa =

Sun Hwa may refer to:

- Sun-hwa (name), Korean given name
- A rank of government artist during Korea's Joseon Dynasty; see hwawon
- Sun Hwa Arts School

== See also ==
- Sunhwa
- Sunhwa-dong, district of Jung-gu, Seoul, South Korea
