= Danwon pungsokdo cheop =

18th century paintings by Kim Hong-do

- Hangul: 단원풍속도첩
- Hanja: 檀園風俗圖帖
- Revised Romanization: Danwon pungsokdo cheop
- McCune–Reischauer: Tanwŏn p'ungsokto ch'ŏp

Danwon pungsokdo cheop (Korean: 단원풍속도첩; Hanja: 檀園風俗圖帖) is an album of genre painting (pungsokhwa or pungsokdo) drawn by Kim Hong-do during the late Joseon period. It was named after Kim's art name, Danwon, and contains 25 paintings. The album is painted with light watercolor on Korean paper. Each painting depicts vividly common people's daily life in the Joseon period.

Danwon pungsokdo cheop is designated as the 527th National Treasure of South Korea and held by National Museum of Korea located in Yongsan District, Seoul, South Korea.

== At work places ==
Picture	Title	Korean title
	Plowing a rice field	논갈이; 耕畓
	Threshing rice	타작; 打作
	Shoeing a horse	편자박기; 蹄鐵
	A smithy	대장간
	Slicing tobacco	담배썰기
	Tiling Giwa	기와이기; 葺瓦
	Fishing	고기잡이; 漁場

== Daily life ==
Picture	Title	Korean title
	Weaving	길쌈; 織造
	Weaving a mat	자리짜기; 編席
	A laundry place	빨래터; 漂母
	By a well	우물가; 井邊
	A divination sign	점괘; 占卦
	Lunch time	점심
	Jumak (tavern)	주막; 酒幕

== On the streets ==
Picture	Title	Korean title
	Ferryboats	나룻배
	Peddling	행상; 行商
	On the way to a market	장터길
	On the way for wedding	신행; 新行
	Bursting into laughter on a street	노상파안; 路上破顔

== Pastime ==
Picture	Title	Korean title
	A gonu nori	고누놀이
	A dancing boy	무동; 舞童
	Ssireum (Korean wrestling)	씨름
	Shooting an arrow	활쏘기; 射弓

== Education ==
Picture	Title	Korean title
	Appreciating a picture	서화감상; 審觀
	Seodang	서당; 書堂

== See also ==
- Hyewon pungsokdo
- Korean painting
- List of Korean painters
- Inwangjesaekdo
