= Hyewon pungsokdo =

17th–18th century paintings by Sin Yun-bok

- Hangul: 혜원풍속도 or 혜원풍속도첩
- Hanja: 蕙園風俗圖 or 蕙園風俗圖帖
- Revised Romanization: Hyewon pungsokdo or Hyewon pungsokdocheop
- McCune–Reischauer: Hyewŏn p'ungsokto or Hyewŏn p'ungsoktoch'ŏp

Hyewon pungsokdo is an album of the genre paintings (pungsokhwa or pungsokdo) drawn by the Korean painter Shin Yunbok during the late Joseon dynasty. It was named after Shin's art name, Hyewon, and comprises 30 paintings in total.

In 1930, Jeon Hyeopil (전형필:全鎣弼), later the founder of the Gansong Art Museum, purchased it from an antique dealer in Osaka, Japan and newly mounted the album. Oh Sechang (오세창), who was a journalist and pro-independence activist, wrote the subtitles and postface for the album. Hyewon pungsokdo is designated as the 135th National Treasure of South Korea and is held in the collection of the Gansong Art Museum located in Seongbuk-gu, Seoul, South Korea.

== Gallery ==
=== Entertainment (7) ===
Picture	Title	Korean title	Description
	Dancing together with two swords	쌍검대무(雙劍對舞)	Two kisaeng are performing geommu(sword dance)
	An amusing day in a spring field	상춘야흥 (賞春野興)	
	Resounding geomungo, praiseworthy lotus	청금상련 (廳琴賞蓮), 혹은 연당야유 (蓮塘野遊)	
	A boat party on the clean river	주유청강 (舟遊淸江)	
	Entertainment for summering	납량만흥 (納凉漫興)	
	Absorbing in the ssangyuk play	쌍육삼매(雙六三昧)	Ssangyuk is a Korean traditional game similar to chess.
	Playing tuho under the forest	임하투호(林下投壺)	Tuho is a Korean traditional competing game similar to darts. Players draw an arrow into a vase.

=== Gibang (5) ===
Picture	Title	Korean title	Description
	Nothing happens in the gibang chamber	기방무사 (妓房無事)	
	Whiling away the hours at a cheongru	청루소일(靑樓消日)	
	Waiting for drinks being served at a hongru	홍루대주 (紅樓待酒)	
	Holding a drinking party	주사거배 (酒肆擧盃)	
	Who will be the hero at the brothel?	유곽쟁웅 (遊廓爭雄)	

=== Daily life (6) ===
Picture	Title	Korean title	Description
	A scenery on Dano day	단오풍정 (端午風情)	
	A story of a street by a stream	계변가화 (溪邊街話)	
	Gossiping at the well at night	정변야화 (井邊夜話)	
	Monks asking for alms on the street	노상탁발 (路上托鉢)	
	A woman washing a laundry meets the seeker	표모봉심 (漂母逢尋)	
	The dance of a shaman	무녀신무 (巫女神舞)	

=== Meeting (5) ===
Picture	Title	Korean title	Description
	Young people's outgoing	연소답청 (年少踏靑)	The picture illustrates a scenery of Hanryang(man-about-town) flirting with Kisaeng on the street in spring.
	Leading a Kisaeng, passing on the red leaves	휴기답풍 (携妓踏楓)	
	Finding the temple after hearing a bell sound.	문종심사(聞鍾尋寺)	
	A Buddhist nun (biguni) greeting a gisaeng	이승영기(尼僧迎妓)	
	Running into each other on the street	노중상봉(路中相逢)	

=== Lovers (5) ===
Picture	Title	Korean title	Description
	Spring mood covers all the places	춘색만원 (春色滿園)	
	A young boy plucking an azalea	소년전홍 (少年剪紅)	
	The lovers under the moon	월하정인(月下情人)	
	A secret meeting under the moon	월야밀회 (月夜密會)	
	A secret trip at night	야금모행(夜禁冒行)	

=== Lust (2) ===
Picture	Title	Korean title	Description
	A widow's lust in spring	이부탐춘 (嫠婦耽春)	
	A beautiful tie between the tree in autumn	삼추가연(三秋佳緣)	

== See also ==
- Danwon pungsokdo cheop
- Korean painting
- List of Korean painters
- Geumgangjeondo
- Inwangjesaekdo
