= Yi Myŏnggi =

Korean painter (fl. 18th century)

Yi Myŏnggi (Korean: 이명기) was a courtesy painter of Joseon. He was a full-time painter during the 18th century, of which records can be found: Yi was named as the courtesy painter in 1791. He was one of the most famed portrait painters during the reign of King Jeongjo, circa the late 18th century. Although he was renowned for the portraits, shan shui paintings heavily dealt with Kim Hongdo's characteristics in terms of shaping rocks, figures and calligraphy.

Several paintings are found in National Museum of Korea and Hoam Art Museum, one of the oldest private museums in Seoul.

== Galleries ==
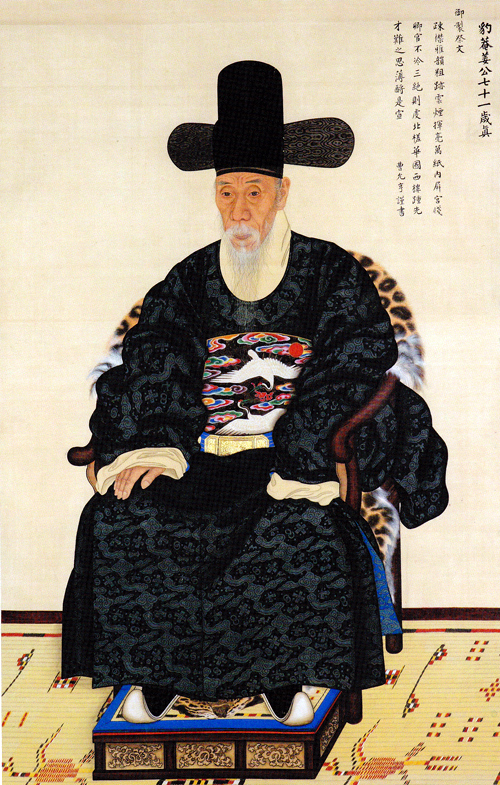
Portrait of Kang Sehwang

== See also ==
- Gim Hongdo
- List of Korean painters
- Korean painting
- Korean art
