= Sun-hwa (name) =

- Hangul: 선화
- RR: Seonhwa
- MR: Sŏnhwa

Sun-hwa, Seon-hwa, or Son-hwa is a Korean given name.

People referred to mononymously by this name include:

- Princess Seonhwa of Silla (fl. 7th century), Korean princess of the Silla Dynasty

Other people with this name include:

- Han Sun-hwa (born 1990), South Korean idol singer, former member of girl group Secret
- Kim Seon-hwa (born 1991), South Korean team handball player
- Lee Seon-hwa (born 1986), South Korean golfer on the LPGA tour
- Oh Seon-hwa (born 1956), South Korean-born Japanese writer and journalist
- Seo Sun-hwa (born 1982), South Korean sports shooter
- Pong Son-hwa (born 1993), North Korean football defender

Fictional characters with this name include:

- Kim Seon-hwa, in 2009 South Korean television series Iris
- Sun-Hwa Kwon, in 2004–2010 American television series Lost

== See also ==
- List of Korean given names
