= Traditional Korean roof construction =

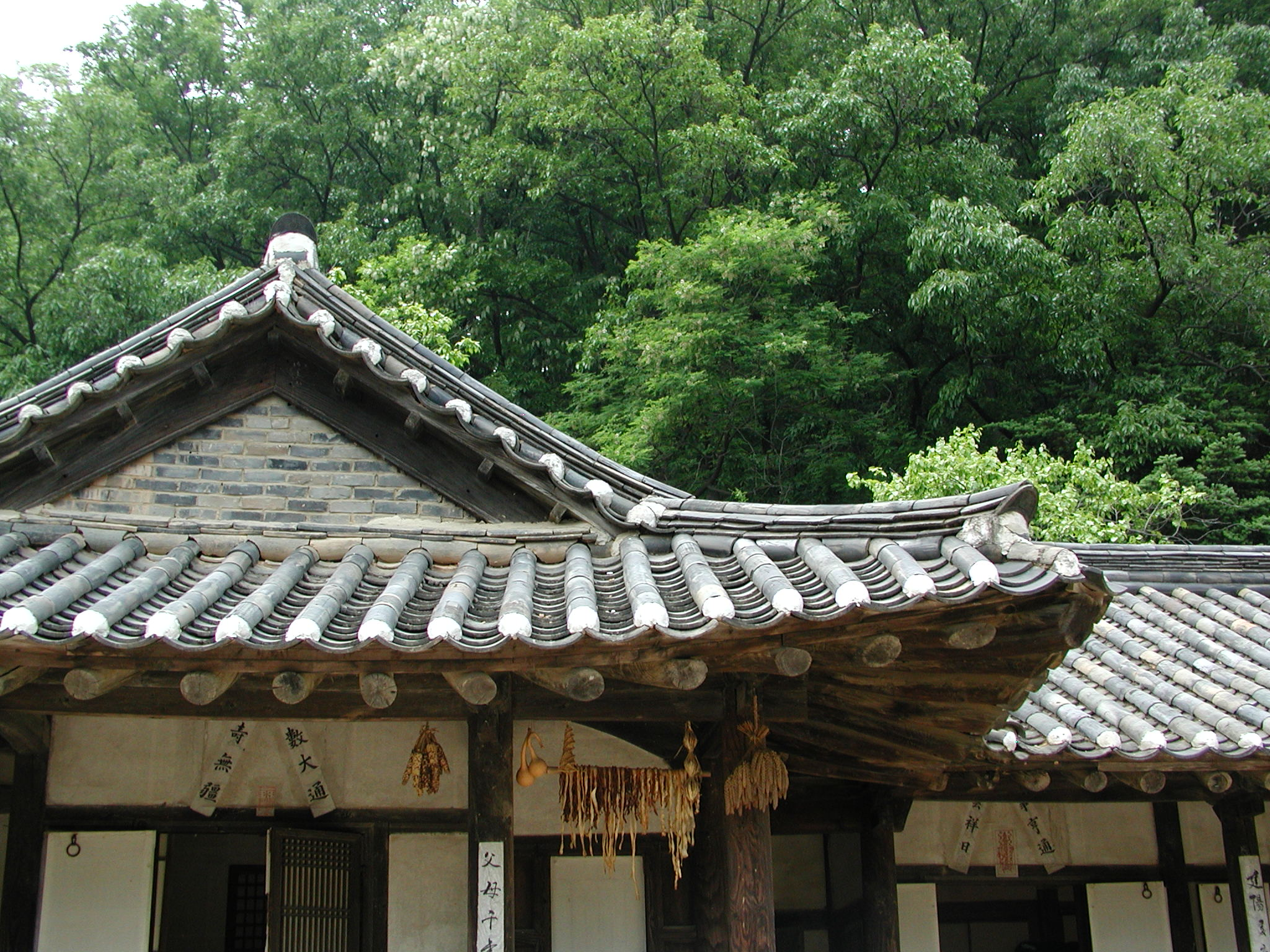
Giwa

Traditional Korean roof construction used many kinds of natural materials. They are made of neowa (shingles), giwa (tiles), byeotjip (rice straw), stone giwa (tiles), eoksae (eulalia), and gulpi (oak bark).

== Neowa (shingle) roof ==
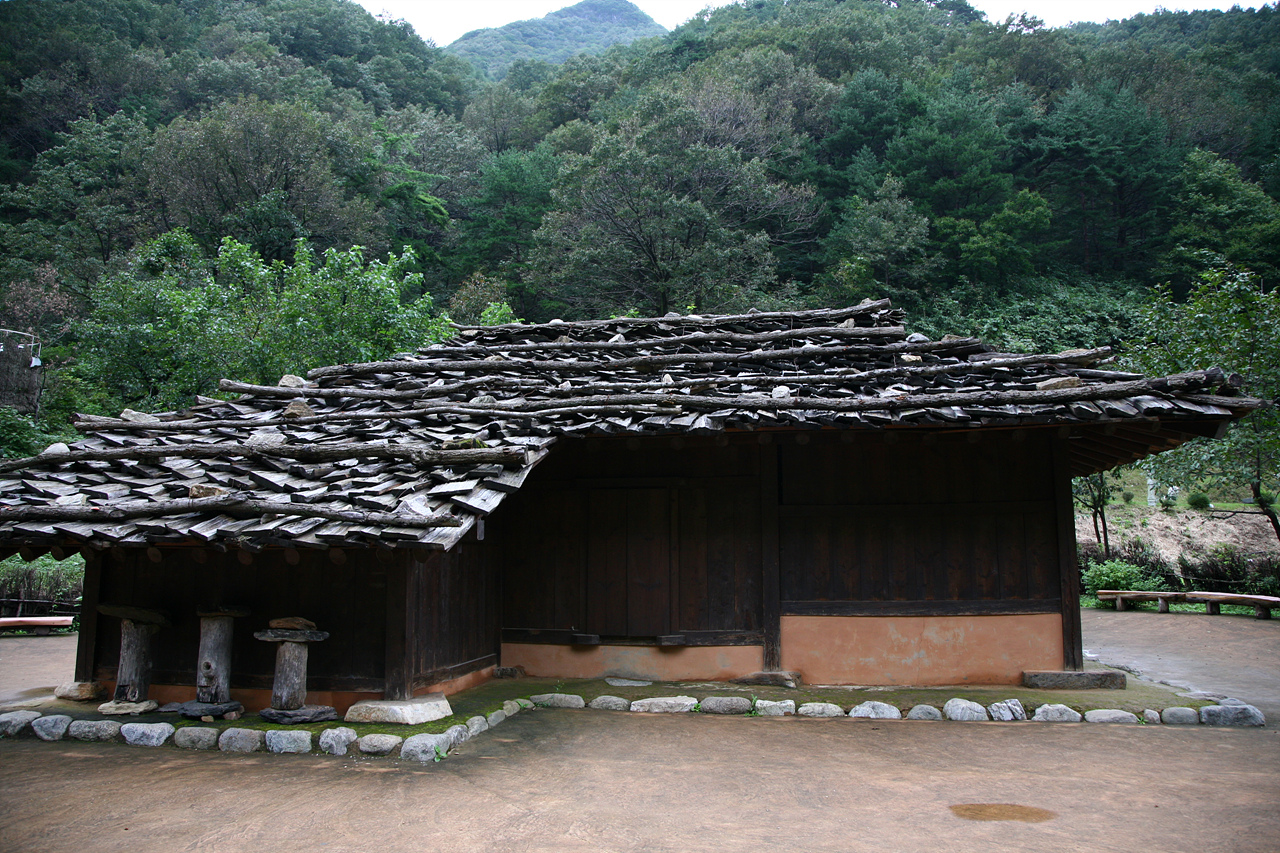
Neowa house in Samchuck, Gangwon province

Neowa (Korean: 너와) rroofs can especially be seen in mountain villages (for example, in Gangwon-do), since these places are harder to supply materials. It is made with pieces of thick bark of nearby 200-year-old red pine trees. The size is usually about 20–30 cm wide, 40–59 cm long and 4–5 cm thickness. Typically, 105–140 neowa are used for one roof. To protect neowa from the wind, heavy stones or logs were put on the roof. The air can be changed through the gaps between neowa, since there was no chimney. Generally, neowa last for approximately five years. However, it is not true that all of neowa changed at the same time. Rotten shingles are replaced. Neowajip has rooms, a kitchen and a cow shed under one square roof, to protect domestic animals from mountain beasts, and to keep warm in winter. As red pine trees disappeared, neowajip disappeared with them. Finally only 3 neowajip remain in Korea.

== Giwa (tile) ==
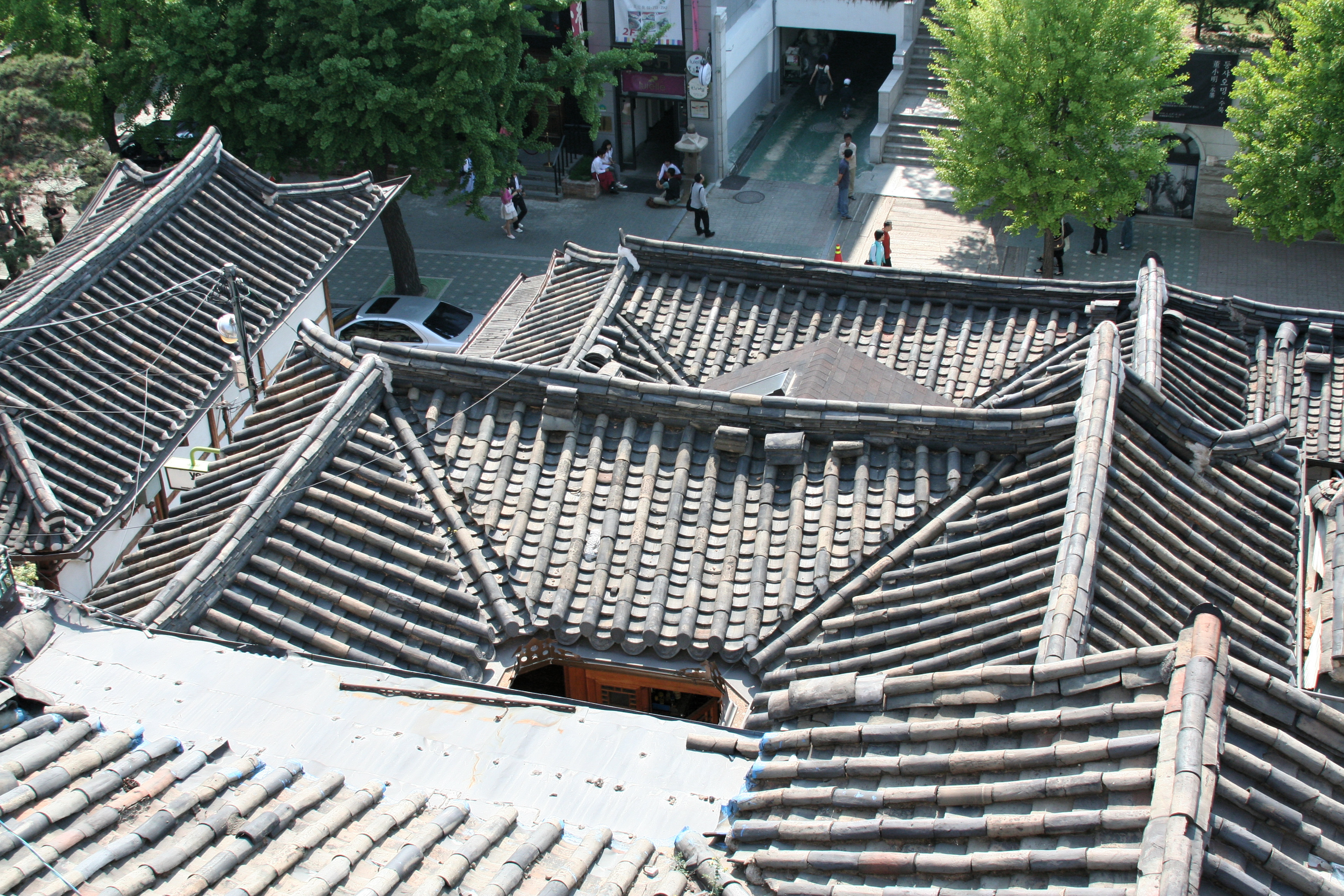
Looking down on hanok rooftops, Samcheong-dong.

Giwa (기와) (gaewa (개와)) is a tile material. A basic form of giwa is amkiwa (암키와; flat giwa) and sukiwa (수키와; round giwa); one giwa can be made by putting together two of these. Clay is kneaded and spread thinly. Then amkiwa is extended upward and downward, and sukiwa cover joints. Giwa can be classified according to materials. Togiwa are made by kneading and baking clay. Cement giwa are made by mixing cement and sand, and metal giwa made by cutting and forming metal. Stone and bronze giwa were found at the ruins of Rome, and marble giwa was used at Greek temples. In addition, cheonggiwa, ozigiwa, etc. are made by glazing. The original giwa were called bongiwa and Japanese giwa "geolchimgiwa".

== Byeotjip (rice straw) ==
Chogajibung (초가지붕a straw roof) is made with byeotjip (rice straw), eulalia or reed, but generally with byeotjip. Byeotjip protects from the sun in summer and warms the house in winter, because it is hollow. Moreover, rain runs off its relatively smooth surface. Warm and soft feeling is given by chogajibung, because of the original properties of byeotjip. Another layer is easily added every year. The roof can be used for drying crops like red pepper and planting pumpkins or gourds.

== Stone giwa (tile) ==
Flat layered stone roofs are called argillite (germpanam). They are common in coal mining areas. Bluestone (cheongseok) is smooth, allowing rain to slide off. Bluestone is put at the bottom, and then different bluestone is added. Argillite is quite durable. The material is costly, and used only by wealthier social classes. It can be seen at some areas of Gyeonggi-do and Gangwon-do.

== Eoksae (eulalia) ==
Eoksae (억새) refers to eulalia. Korea has ten kinds of eulalia. The eulalia leaf is good for waterproofing and durability. It is a strong material and a single covering will last ten years. It is also used in weaving rain-gear (rainwear) or straw sandals. The material should be dried with dew for a week. Then it is put in a shady pot for good airing.

== Gulpi (oak bark) ==
Gulpi (굴피) is found in mountain villages. The bark is over 20 years old. The oak bark is peeled during Chuseo (one of the 24 seasonal divisions, about August 23). Next it is soaked in water. After that, it is dried and a heavy stone is placed on it to flatten it. Bark made this way is commonly about 1.3 meters wide. If the air gets dry, the bark shrinks and leaves many holes. However, if it rains or its humidity is increased, the holes shrink and disappear quickly. This durable material lead to the saying, "Giwa exists for ten thousand years, and the Oak Bark for one thousand years."
