= Hwawŏn =

Government-sponsored artists in Joseon

Hwawŏn (Korean: 화원; Hanja: 畵員) is the term for any government artist during Joseon dynasty. The terminology technically includes several painters, which are in different ranks, called Seonhwa, Seonhoe, Hwasa and Hoesa.

== Status ==
The organization setup belongs to Dohwaso, which had a total of twenty people for hwawŏn according to Gyeongguk daejeon. In 1785, however, during the reign of Jeongjo 9, the system became modified, general personnel raised by 30. Under the supervisation of Dohwaseo, it gained several times of modification concerning its setup.

Although, for many painters, becoming governmental officers was highly limited chances to gain, hwawŏn could take not only his seat but also further opportunities, which allowed them to work after retirement, with certain payment. Those positions were referred as Seobanche Ajik (서반체아직; 西班遞兒職).

== Appointment ==
Promotion of hwawŏn was determined by official competition, whether the painter is newly chosen or not. If one does not pass on the examination, no promotion for higher seat was given for anyone however long he worked as a member in Dohwaseo. Five patterns of examination normally account for drawing juk (bamboo), sansoo (Mountain and River), figure, Yeongmo and finally flowers and grasses.

For applicants, they were permitted to take 2 out of 5, distinguished by 4 ranks, while generally credits for juk and sansoo highest. The methodologies Dohwaseo picked up were intended to adopt more skillful and competent painter.

For social position, most hwawŏn were not Yangban (aristocrates) but Jungin (middle class) or offspring from wedlocks. Since the 16th century, the occupation became solid trade business of certain family.

== Occupation ==
Hwawŏn were in charge of painting portraits of kings and queens and also of several royal families, higher subjects. When it came to national-level courtesy, worship, the terminology for the painting became ŭigwedo (의궤도, 儀軌圖). Depending on each jobs, surveyed maps for palaces, maps or folding screens can also be drawn.

== See also ==
- Kim Hong-do
- An Gyeon

== Notes ==
- Cho Jeong Yuk, 2011, A day of Hwawon in Joseon dynasty (Korean)
- Lee Seong Mi, 2005, Artistic culture during Joseon Dynasty (Korean)
