= Bantamwork =

Bantamwork in 18th-century England signified a particular style of export lacquerware which was cut into a layer of gesso and then lacquered in colors.

== History ==
By the mid-17th century, trade with China and Japan had flourished in Europe. Oriental curiosities included lacquered cabinets and screens. The beautiful lacquer and ornamentation were highly prized. One of many Chinese lacquers was known as "Coromandel" or "bantomwork". It is assumed that it is named after Bantam in Java, which played an important part in the export of oriental crafts to Europe.

== Oriental Process ==
The sap of the Toxicodendron vernicifluum tree, indigenous to China, was used on the pieces. Once the sap had dried, it could be applied in coats, forming a hard crust. This crust could be carved in relief. Color could be added to the sap, usually red, black and aubergine, to add variety to the pieces.

== European Process ==
True Oriental lacquer could not be produced in Europe, because the Rhus vernicifera tree was not grown in Europe. An imitation based on shellac made from insect secretions was developed. This was known as japanning. Japanning, using white, blue and green as well as the traditional colors, is still used today.
