= Minhwa =

Korean folk art

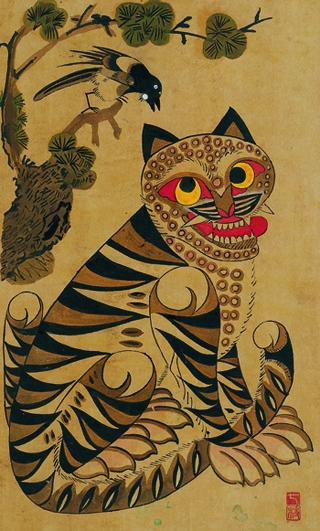
- Magpie and Tiger is one of the representative paintings of Korean folk painting.

Korean name
- Hangul: 민화
- Hanja: 民畵
- RR: minhwa
- MR: minhwa

Minhwa (Korean: 민화; Hanja: 民畵) refers to Korean folk art produced mostly by itinerant or unknown artists without formal training, emulating contemporary trends in fine art for the purpose of everyday use or decoration.

This type of painting was often the work of anonymous craftsmen who faithfully adhered to the styles, canons and genres inherited from the past. Minhwa also involved a magical dimension. They were believed to possess beneficial virtues and to protect the owner and his family from evil forces. They feature popular themes such as cranes, rocks, water, clouds, the sun, moon, pine trees, tortoises, insects and flowers, painted onto paper or on canvas throughout the Chosun era (1392–1910). Minhwa was a traditional art form intimately connected to the lives of the Korean people, best embodying the Korean sentiment.

As one of the art traditions in which the artworks design found direct visual form outside the elite court and literati painting traditions, Minhwa occupies a distinctive place in the history of East Asian painting. Created by and for the common people, it is a record of Korean folk culture and everyday life across centuries.

Historically, this tradition was known as sokhwa (俗畵; 속화), meaning "folk painting," a term recorded in the 19th-century encyclopedic work Ojuyeonmunjangjeonsango (五洲衍文長箋散稿) by scholar Yi Gyugyeong (1788–1865), who described it as paintings found on folding screens, scrolls, and walls of ordinary households. The term minhwa (民畵), now the standard academic designation worldwide, was introduced in the early 20th century by Japanese aesthetician Yanagi Sōetsu, who brought this Korean tradition to international attention. However, its use remains a subject of debate among Korean scholars and artists, some of whom argue that sokhwa more authentically reflects the tradition's identity as it was understood from within Korean society itself, predating outside designation by centuries. Its roots stretch back to the very beginnings of the Joseon dynasty, first taking shape within the walls of the royal court before spreading to the common people.

Court decorative painting was created for use in palaces by royal court painters before anonymous artists adopted and dispersed their art to the populace. Minhwa art developed into its present form in the 17th century. The artists were common people who went from place to place, often following festivals, where they would paint for the locals, fulfilling their commissions on the spot. The artists were unknown commoners of the low and middle class and some were traveling visitors, usually attending festivals who followed trends in fine art, to develop the crude minhwa style artwork. Important stages in life were also marked by the painting of a minhwa picture. Though some art that was thought to be minhwa has been found in nobles' homes, Euigwe documents show that those were more likely tradition court decorative paintings by known artists that were unknown prior to these documents being discovered.

The paintings worked on a number of levels. They show figures from folk mythology and legends, symbols of happiness, wealth and health, and scenes of everyday life. The most common figures were animals that represented power, such as the tiger, or providential circumstances, such as carp, which represent success. The paintings were done on paper and on canvas.

Minhwa colorfully represents the perspectives, religions, symbols of daily life and desires, and folk mythologies of its time. It featured robust animals as supernatural such as tigers, dragons, insects, and cranes, and featured colorful natural backgrounds with peonies, clouds, lotuses, water, or the sun. The unique symbolism blended Buddhism, shamanism, Confucianism, and Taoism.

After a decline during the colonial rule, the art form experienced a short boom until laid low by the Korean War. In the 1980s, though, there was a revival of Minhwa, the interest and popularity of which persists to this day.

Minhwa was hanged by the front door to bring about happiness and luck. Minhwa was a detailed process from scratch. It consisted of making the pigments from natural ingredients and coloring [[Korean paper|hanji,]] or Korean paper.

Minhwa is still around, but can mostly be seen at museums, as street art in older neighborhoods, and crafts. It is seen on the hanbok, folding screens, tee shirts, car stickers, dishes, fans, and more. The combined wit, humor, happiness, informality, exaggerations similar to caricatures, and freedom of expression aligns even with contemporary art pieces to exhibit an understanding of Korean culture.

Some notable minhwa artists are Yi Am who was the great-grandson of King Sejong the Great, Sin Saimdang, and Byeon Sangbyeok.

== Genres ==
There are several categories of minhwa art styles. Morando showcased paintings of peonies that were popular with ceremonies, marriages, and royal events. Morando was the most popular and represented honor and wealth. Yunhwa-do were paintings of lotuses to represent noble characters and included fish, birds, and insects. Lotus and ducks represented familial happiness, marital love, and were used for decorations.

Chaekgeori are the popular book and stationary paintings and munjado are paintings of Chinese characters. Hwajodo were paintings of flowers and birds such as the peacock that represented advancement. Flowers and butterflies seen in hwajodo styles represented hope for love and domestic unity between married couples, harmony, and balance. It also encouraged prosperity and relates to shamanism's protective features. Religion was exhibited in ssanghak pandodo with a painting of two cranes and peaches to symbolize Korean Taoism.

Hojakdo is paintings of tigers, magpies, and pine trees with the Hopeedo style featuring paintings of tiger stripes. The tiger imagery indicated government and was drawn to look less fearsome. Magpies were drawn to bring good news or friendly company. Chochungdo is paintings of flowers and insects. Yongsudo is the paintings of divine animals. Furry animals were represented in the Yeongmodo paintings. Fish, as seen in eohaedo paintings, symbolized fertility, warded off and warned of evil, and could be found in a bride's room. Sipjangsaengdo was the painting of the 10 symbols of longevity. Sogwado showcased vegetables and fruits that symbolized the continued family lineage. The representation of longevity included images of the sun, clouds, rocks, pine trees, bamboo, deer, and turtles, mountains, fish, peaches, or the moon.

Yonghodo is paintings of powerful animals such as the tiger and dragon who protected people from bad luck. The royal court artists created paintings of the sun and moon over trees (Ilwolbusangdo) early in the Choson era to signify royal protection over all of the people.

=== Magpie and tiger ===
Kkachi horangi (까치호랑이; --虎狼-) is a prominent genre of minhwa that depicts magpies and tigers. In kkachi horangi paintings, the tiger, which is intentionally given a ridiculous and stupid appearance (hence its nickname 'idiot tiger' 바보호랑이, babo horangi), represents authority and the aristocratic yangban, while the dignified magpie represents the common man. Hence, kkachi horangi paintings of magpies and tigers were a satire of the hierarchical structure of Joseon's feudal society.

=== Flower writing ===
Munjado (문자도; 文字圖), also known as 'flower writing' (꽃글씨; kkotgeulssi), is a genre of minhwa that enjoyed popularity in the 18th and 19th centuries, in which large Chinese characters associated with Confucian philosophy are painted as a representation of their meaning, with depictions of related stories and themes painted into the characters themselves.

=== Chaekgeori ===
Chaekgeori is a genre of still-life painting that features books as the dominant subject. Originally a court art embraced by the upper class, chaekgeori spread to the minhwa folk art of the common class in the 19th century, resulting in more expressionist and abstract depictions, and the diminished prominence of bookshelves as a primary motif.

== In popular culture ==
- The animated musical film KPop Demon Hunters (2025) features a pet tiger and magpie duo based on the classic minhwa motif.

== Literature ==
- Korean Tiger: An Exhibition of Korean Folk Painting; To Commemorate the Dedication of the Olympic stadium; Seoul, Sept.29-Oct.14, 1984. Zayong Zo [editor]. Seoul: Emilie Museum, 1984.
- Yoon, Yul Soo, 2005, Minhwa, designhouse.

== Gallery ==
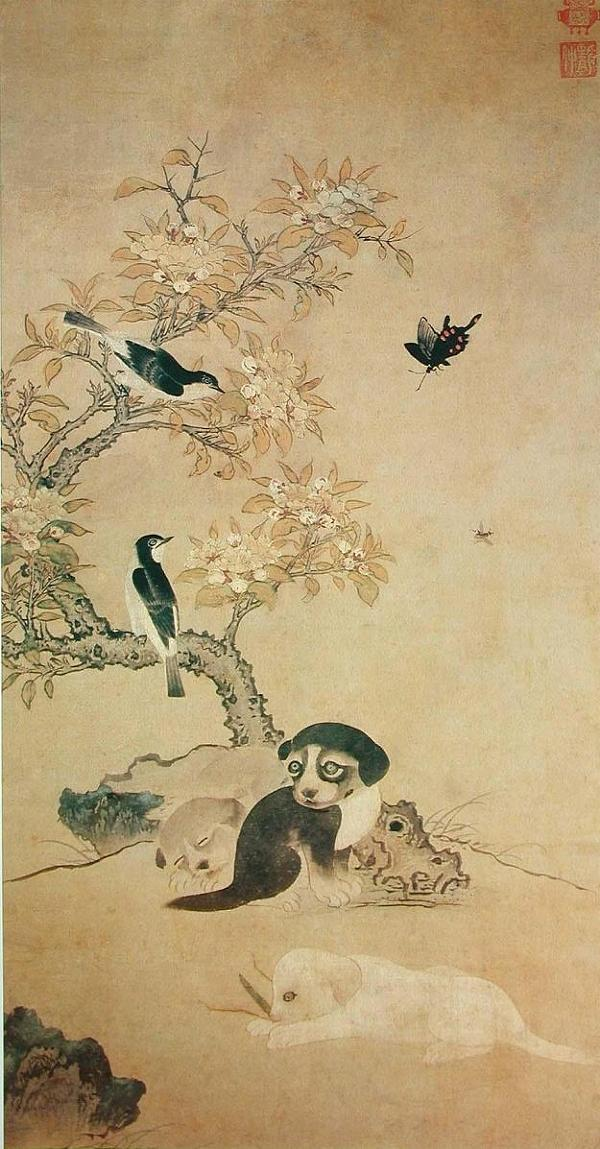
Hwanjogujado (picture of puppies and flowers, birds)

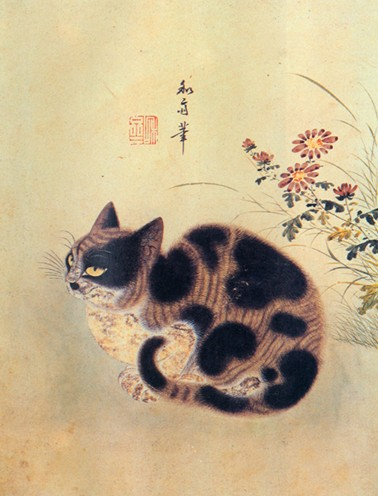
Myogudo (Cat)

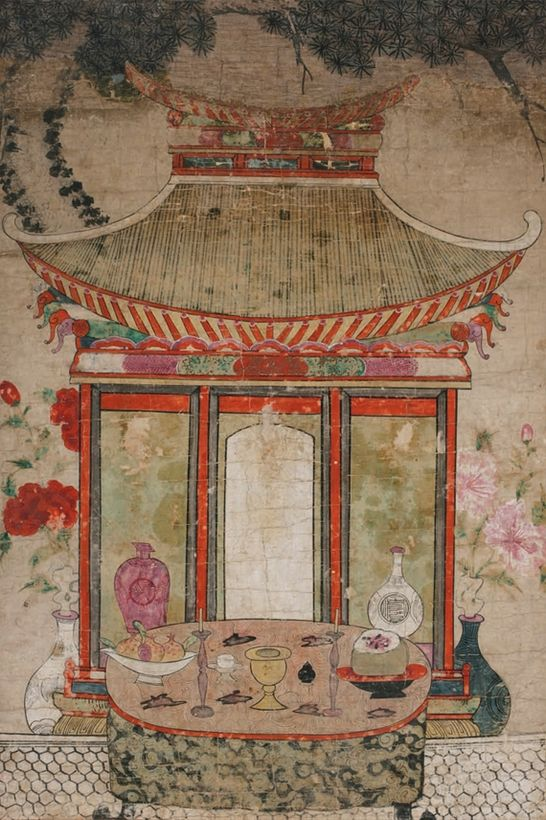
Gammo yeojaedo (감모여제도, 感慕如在圖)

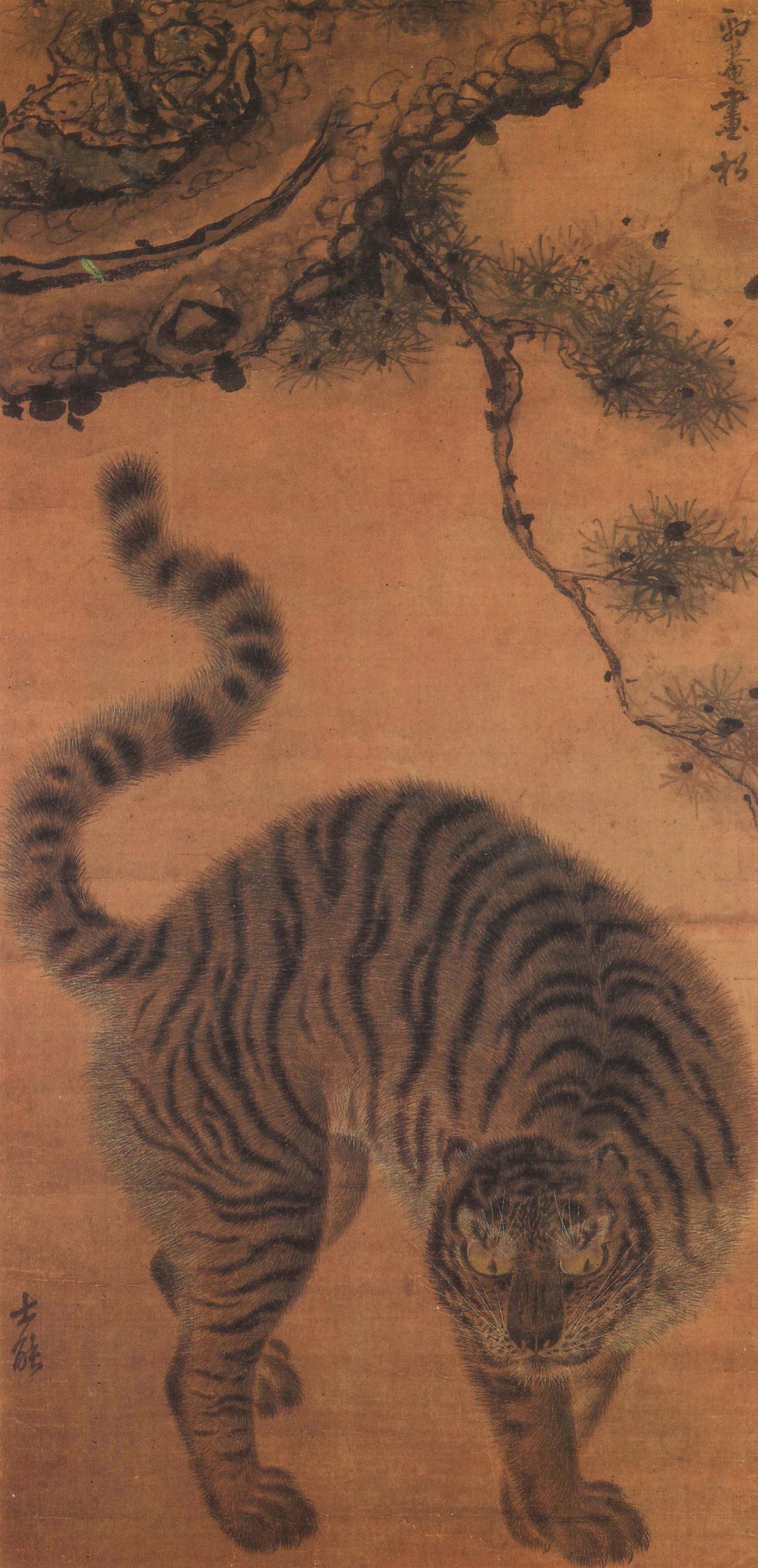
Hojakdo (Tiger)

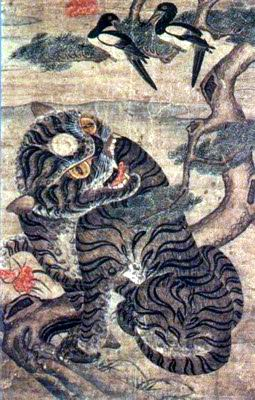
Magpie and tiger

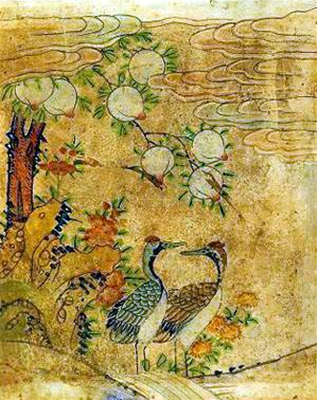
Ssanghak pandodo, literally "picture of two cranes and peaches in Sungyeong", paradise of Korean Taoism

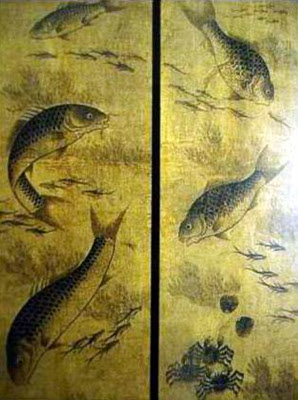
Eohado (picture of fish and crabs)

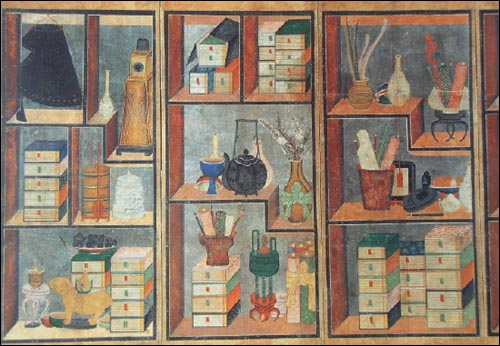
Chaekgeoli

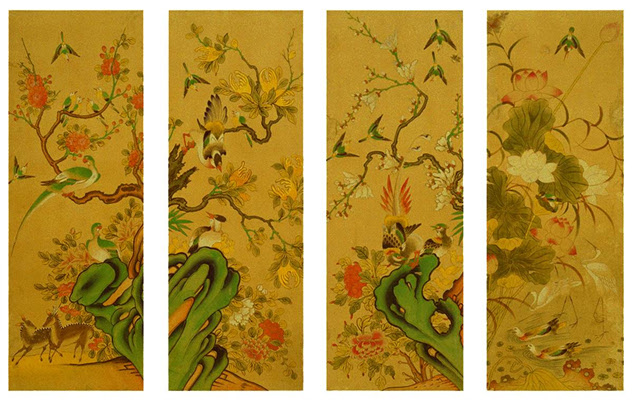
Hwajodo (flowers and birds)

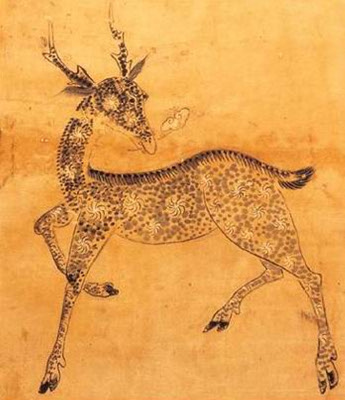
Jangsaeng hwarakdo

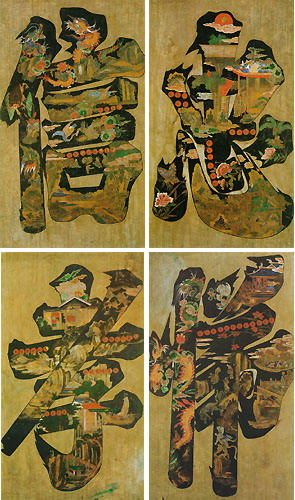
Munjado

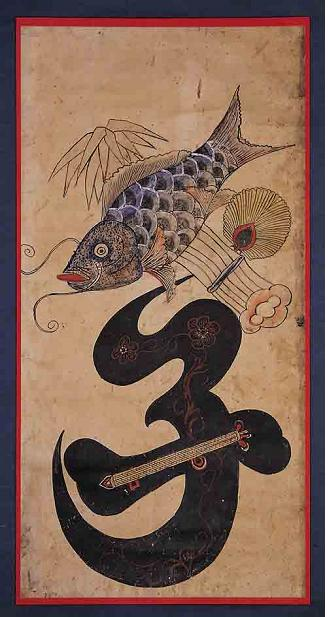
Munjado
