= Irworobongdo =

Korean painted folding screen

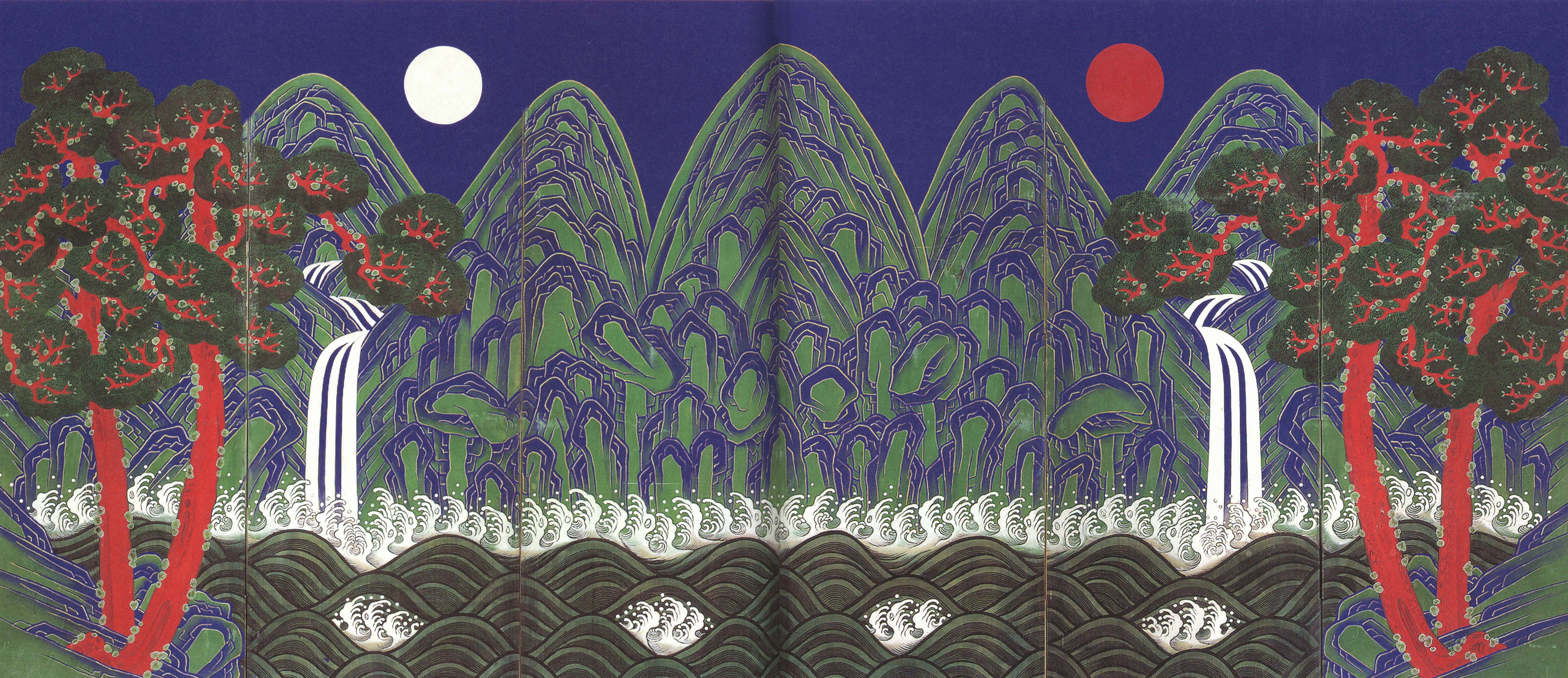

Korean name
- Hangul: 일월오봉도; 일월도; 일월곤륜도
- Hanja: 日月五峯圖; 日月圖; 日月崑崙圖
- RR: Irworobongdo; Irwoldo; Irwolgollyundo
- MR: Irwŏrobongdo; Irwŏlto; Irwŏlgollyundo

Irworobongdo (Korean: 일월오봉도; Hanja: 日月五峯圖) is a Korean folding screen with a highly stylized landscape painting of a sun and moon, five peaks which always was set behind Eojwa, the king’s royal throne during the Joseon Dynasty. It literally means "Painting of the Sun, Moon and the Five Peaks" and is also called "Irwoldo" ("Painting of the Sun and Moon") or "Irwolgonryundo" ("Painting of the Sun, Moon and Mount Kunlun"). The sun and moon symbolize the king and queen while the five peaks denotes a mythical place. The screen serves to display the majesty of the Joseon royal court.

== Description of the image ==
The scene depicts a burning red sun, a full moon, five craggy peaks, and two fast-flowing streams with cascades, all flanked by a pair of conifers. The brilliant colours — known as tang-chae (Tang colours) — were fixed with either animal or fish glue, rendering the screens brilliant and waterfast. New York Times critic Holland Cotter has described the screen's solid, saturated colors and robust forms as being regular as "textile patterns", and noted that these screens have "an archaic, hieratic look unlike Chinese or Japanese painting of the time."

== Symbolic significance ==
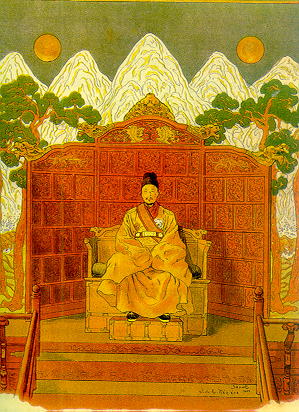
The Irworobongdo on a portrait of Gojong, king of Joseon Dynasty

There are no existing documents from an early period to explain the original iconography of the Five Peaks. Chadwick reports the findings of Dr. Yi Song-mi, Professor of Art History at the Academy of Korean Studies in Seoul. He has suggested that these screens were one of the most important elements in the throne hall, and that this formalized landscape illustrates the Joseon political cosmology. The "almost" red sun represents the king as the yang, the positive male principle, while the white moon represents the queen as the yin, the negative female principle. These two principles make the universe work.

An alternative explanation is that the screen might represent the blessing of Korea by Heaven, symbolized by the sun and moon in balance. When the king sat in front of this screen, he appeared to be at the pivotal point from which all force emanated and to which all returned. Thus, imbued with sacred power, the screen manifests a political cosmology as evidence of Heaven's favour, mandate, and continued protection of the ruler.

== History of the screens ==
Chadwick (1998) also reports Yi's (1996) study of the history of such screens. He attempts to establish whether they were used at the start of the Joseon Dynasty reigned by King Taejo (r. 1392–1398). One suggestion Yi reports is that the practice of using the Five Peaks screen was established by Chŏng Tojŏn. He was instrumental in the adoption of Neo-Confucianism as the Joseon's state ideology. Chŏng Tojŏn used the screen as an important part of the design of the Joseon palace architecture in 1392. However, there is a painting from the 16th century referred to as "The martial arts performance at Soch'ong-dae in the reign of King Myeongjong" (r. 1545–1567) and there is no screen behind the throne. A 19th century copy however has the screen in place behind the throne. Yi therefore suggests that the 1392 date might be far too early and prefers a more recent date for the establishment of the screens. He suggests that screens role might well have been adopted after the 1592 Imjin wars as an attempt to reaffirm the dynasty's power.

The National Museum of Korea's entry on the screens asserts that the earliest written evidence for the use of a Sun, Moon, and Five Peaks screen in the Joseon palace dates from the mid-seventeenth century, but suggests that they could have been used earlier, as part of the Joseon court tried to distinguish itself from that of the Goryeo court.

Palace records suggest that the screens were constantly being produced. Today however, only around twenty originals remain. None are signed. Examples of the screens can be seen at royal palaces in Seoul.

== In popular culture ==
Irworobongdo appears on the obverse of the 10,000 South Korean won banknote.

The Irworobongdo appears in multiple scenes in the Netflix animated film KPop Demon Hunters (2025), including during Huntrix's live performance of "Golden" at the fictional Idol Awards.

Irworobongdo appears in the teaser for the semifinals match in League of Legends Worlds 2023 between T1 and JD Gaming as a framing device for the rivalry between Faker and Ruler.

== Gallery ==
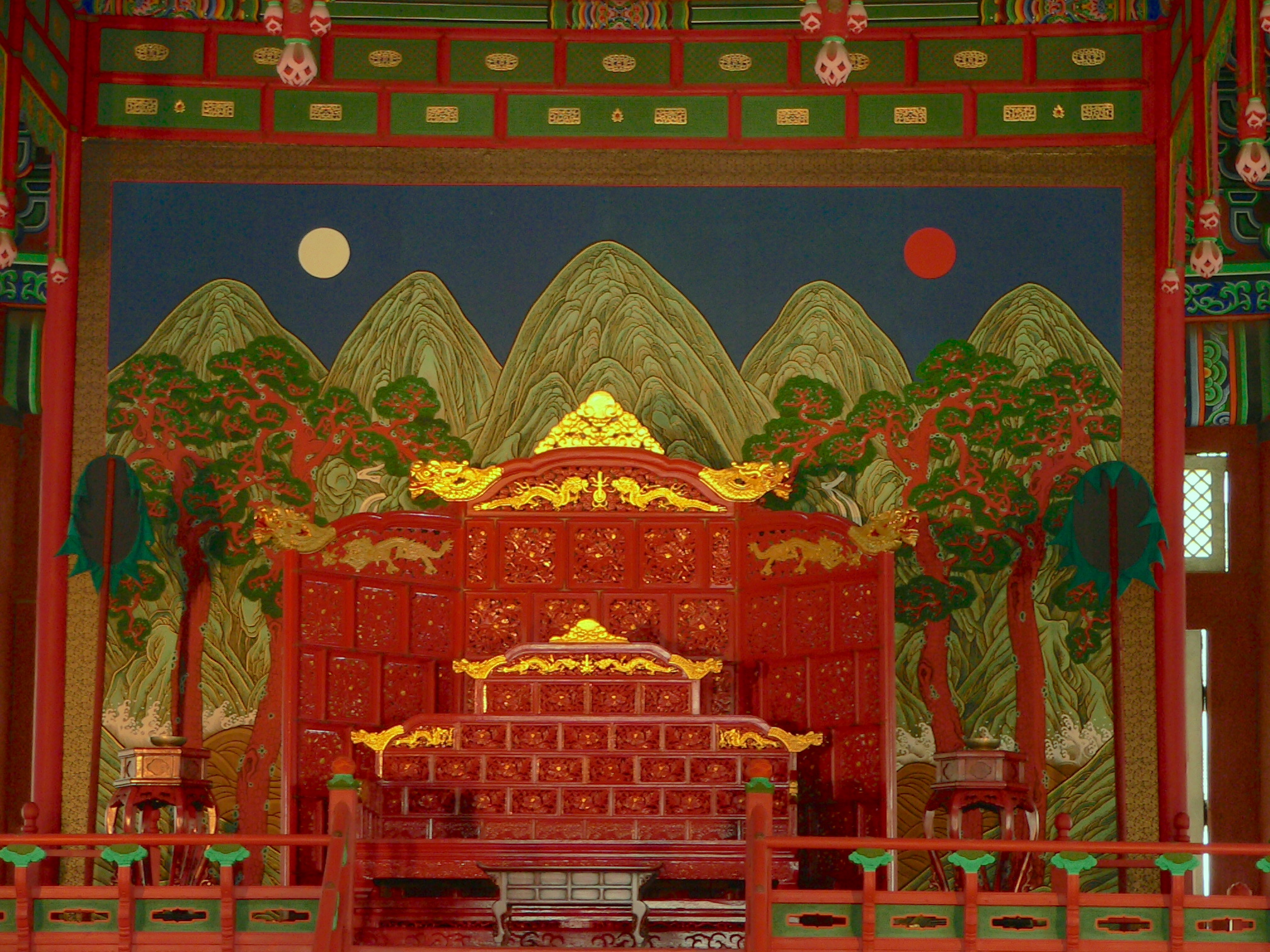
Irworobongdo in the throne hall of Gyeongbokgung Palace

Irworobongdo in the throne hall of Changdeokgung Palace

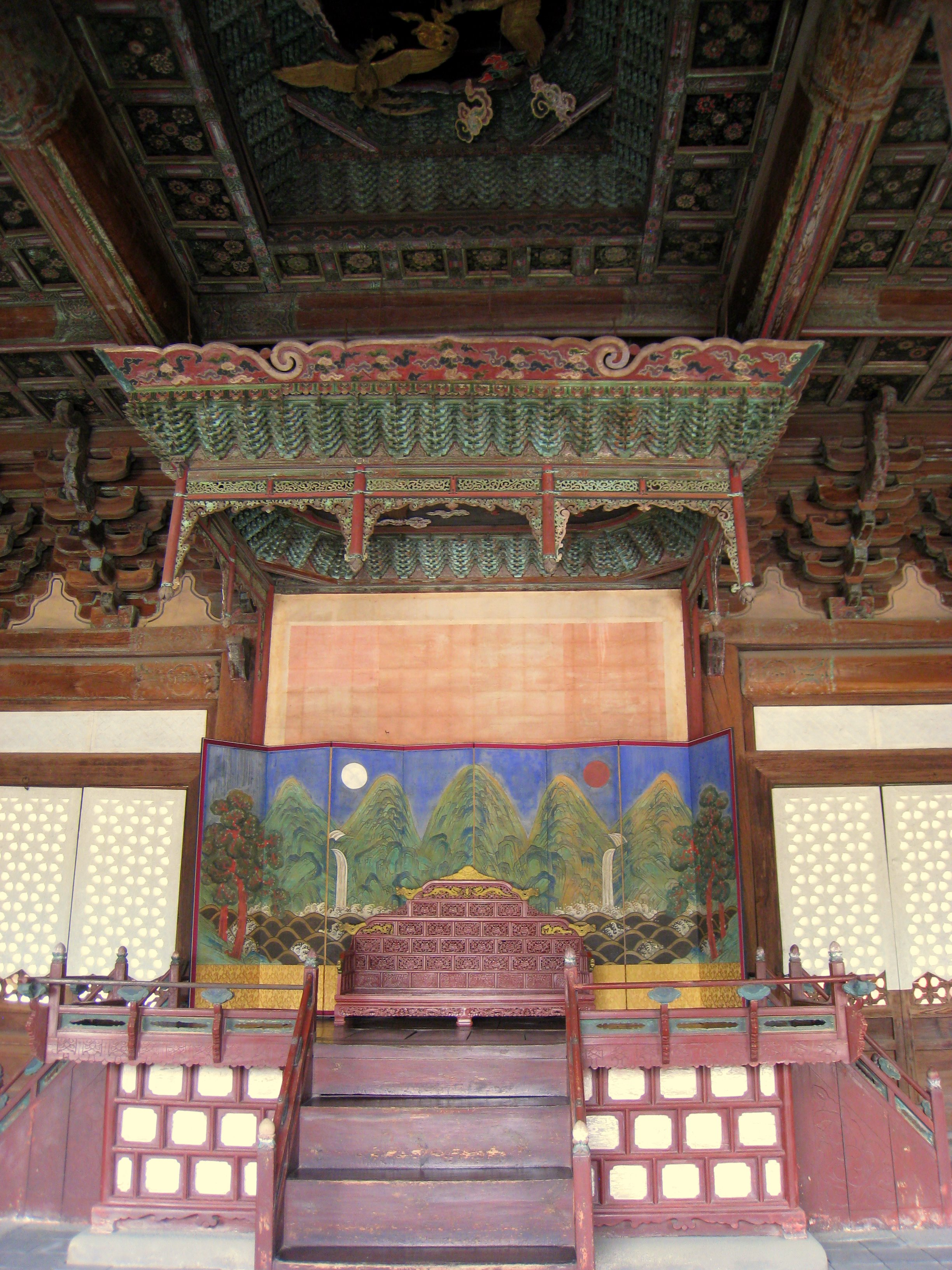
Irworobongdo in the throne hall of Changgyeonggung Palace

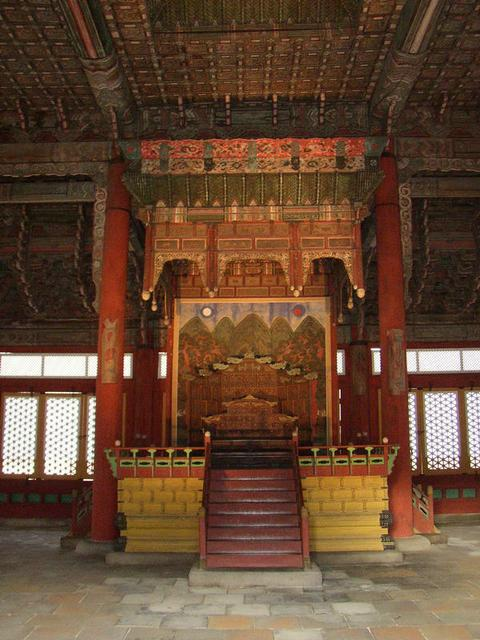
Irworobongdo in the throne hall of Deoksugung Palace

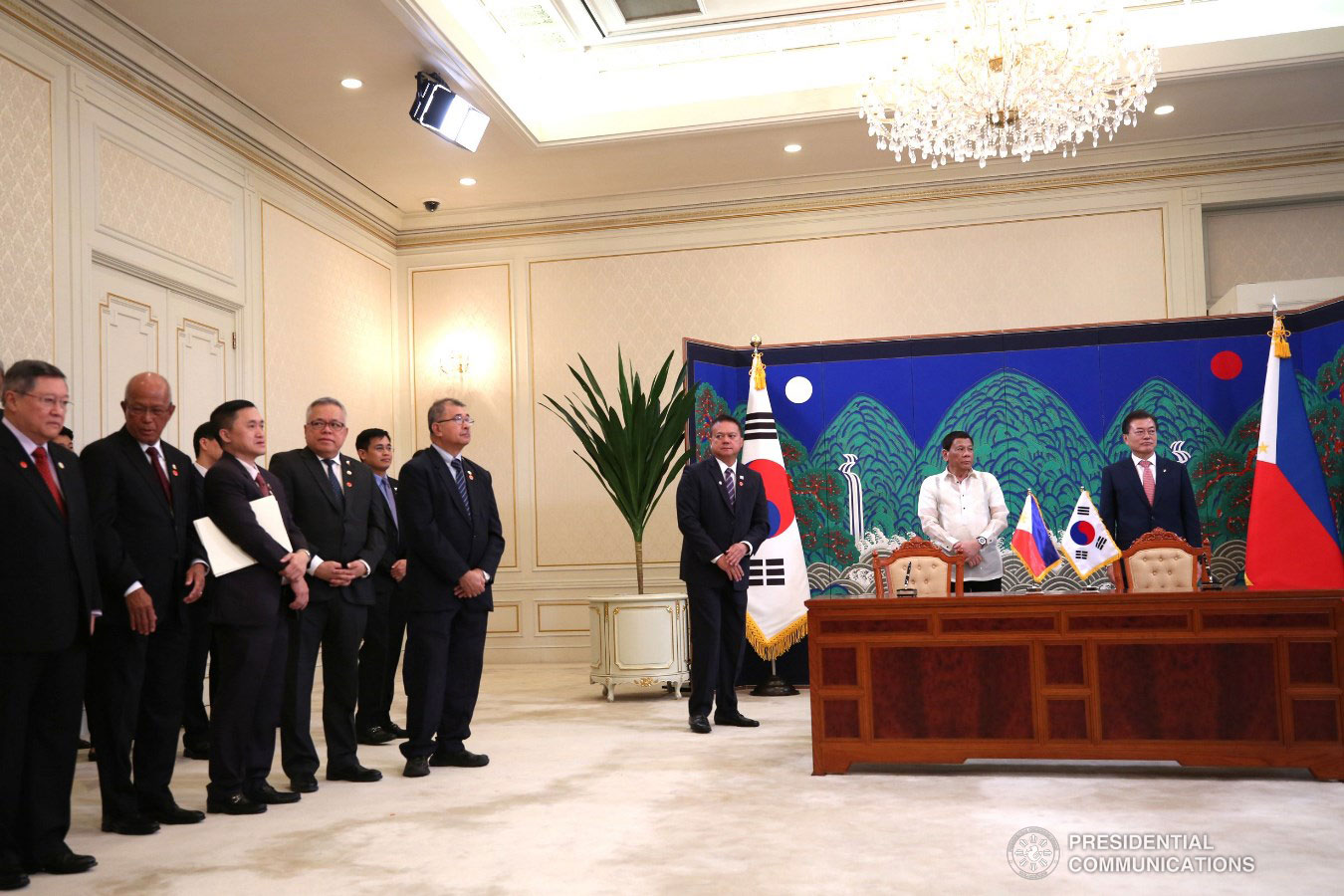
Irworobongdo in the Blue House

== See also ==
- Chaekgeori
- Five Mountains of Korea
- Korean art

== Other sources ==
- Kim H. N. Exploring eighteenth century courts arts. In: Korean arts of the eighteenth century: splendor and simplicity. New York: Asia Society Galleries, 1993:40–1.
