= Chaekgeori =

Genre of Korean still-life paintings

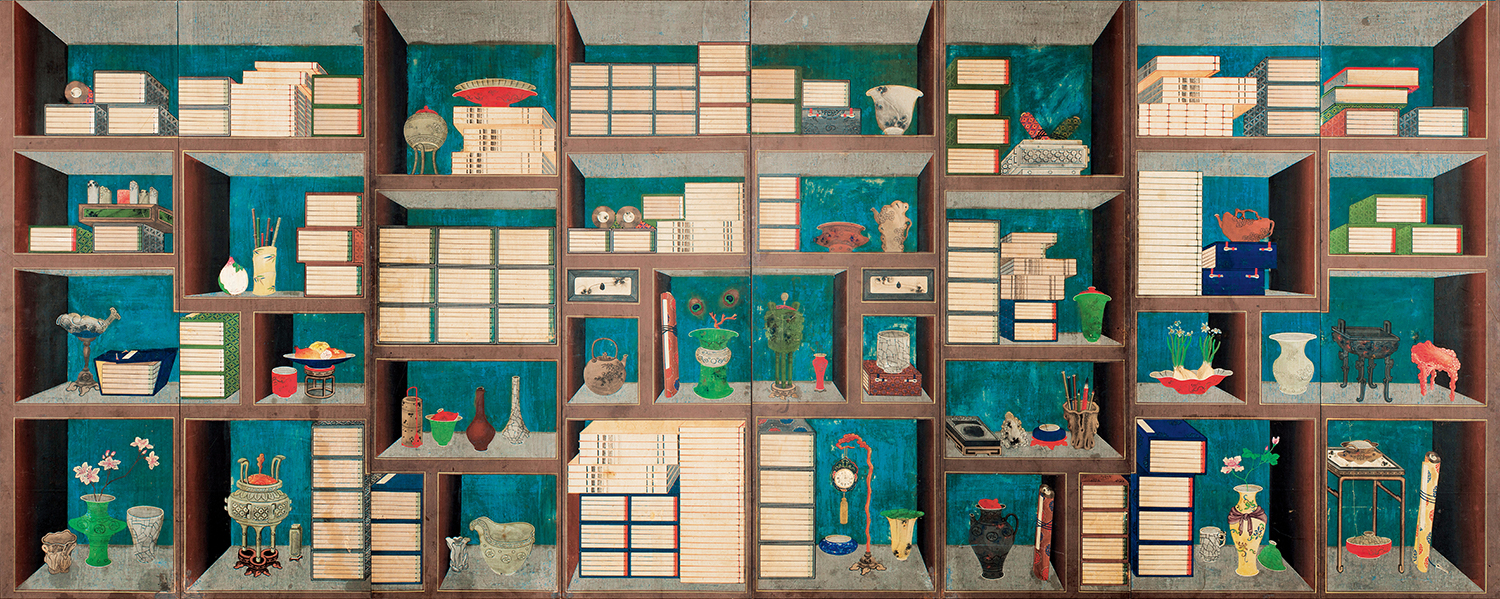
Chaekgeori screen by Yi Eungrok, 1864–1872

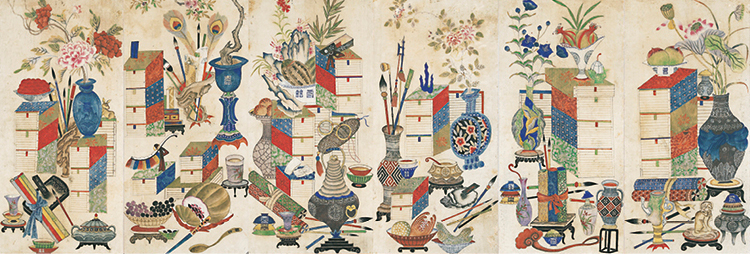
Six-panel chaekgori folding screen, late 1800s

Chaekgeori (Korean: 책거리; Hanja: 冊巨里), translated as "books and things", is a genre of still-life painting from the Joseon period of Korea that features books as the dominant subject. The chaekgeori tradition flourished from the second half of the 18th century to the first half of the 20th century and was enjoyed by all members of the population, from the king to the commoners, revealing the infatuation with books and learning in Korean culture.

== Names ==
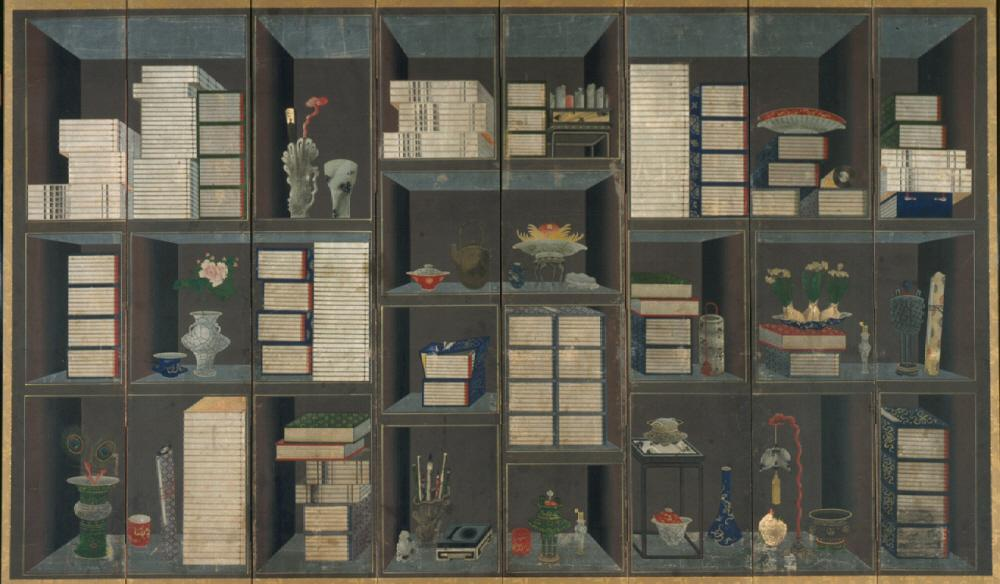
Screen by Yi Eungrok, 1860–1874

Chaekgeori that features bookshelves is called chaekgado (책가도; 冊架圖). Chaekgeori is also known as munbangdo (문방도; 文房圖).

== History ==
During the 18th century, Joseon experienced a golden age following the turbulence of the 17th century; the arts flourished, and new artistic themes and genres emerged.

Developed in the 18th century, chaekgeori was personally propagated by King Jeongjo, a bibliophile who promoted studious learning, and embraced by the aristocratic yangban class of Joseon society. Early chaekgeori paintings were prized for their illusionistic realism. In the 19th century, chaekgeori spread to the minhwa folk art of the common class, which resulted in more expressionist and abstract depictions, and the diminished prominence of bookshelves as a primary motif. Court chaekgeori were used in both ritual ceremonies and as decoration, but minhwa chaekgeori were displayed solely as a decoration in homes.

== Influences ==
King Jeongjo promoted cultural exchange with the Qing dynasty, leading to increased exposure and importation of Chinese and European cultural items. Some of the depicted items in chaekgeori are of foreign origin from China, Japan, and the West. Chaekgado incorporated Western linear perspective and shading techniques, and the depicted bookshelves reveal influence of the duobaoge treasure cabinets of the Qing dynasty, though more symmetrical and systematic. The duobaoge itself was influenced by the European cabinet of curiosities brought into China by Jesuit missionaries.

== Gallery ==
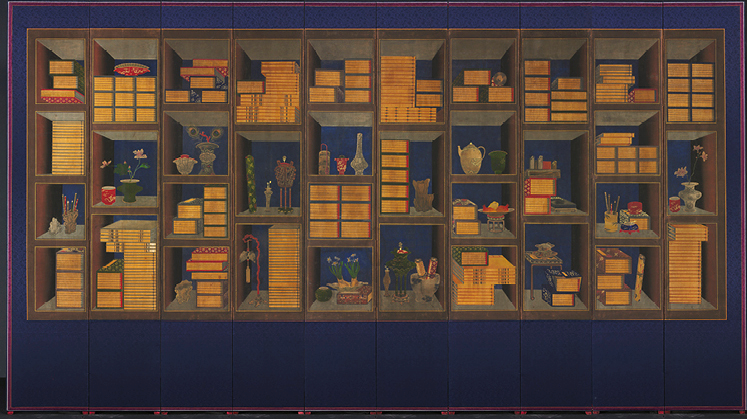

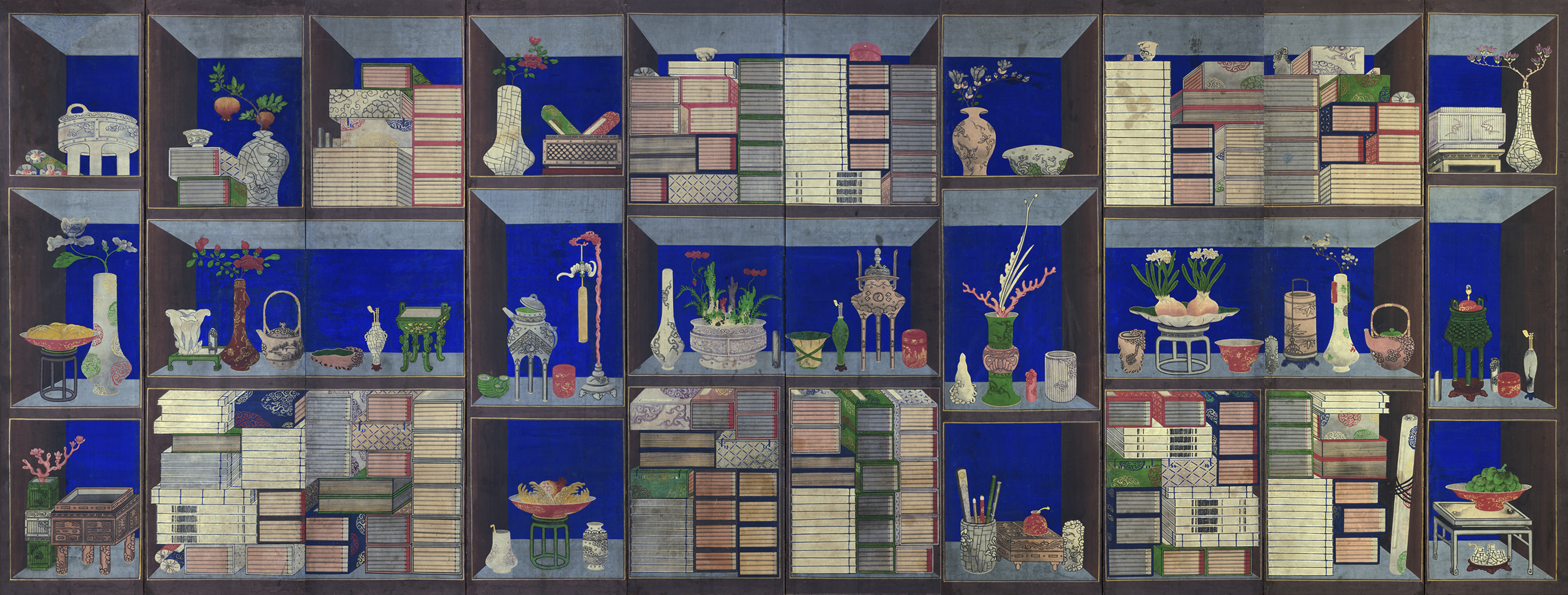

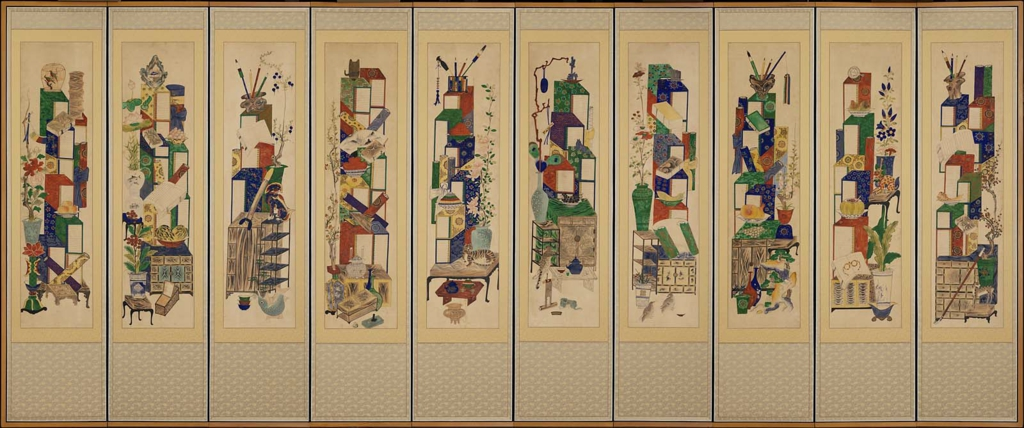

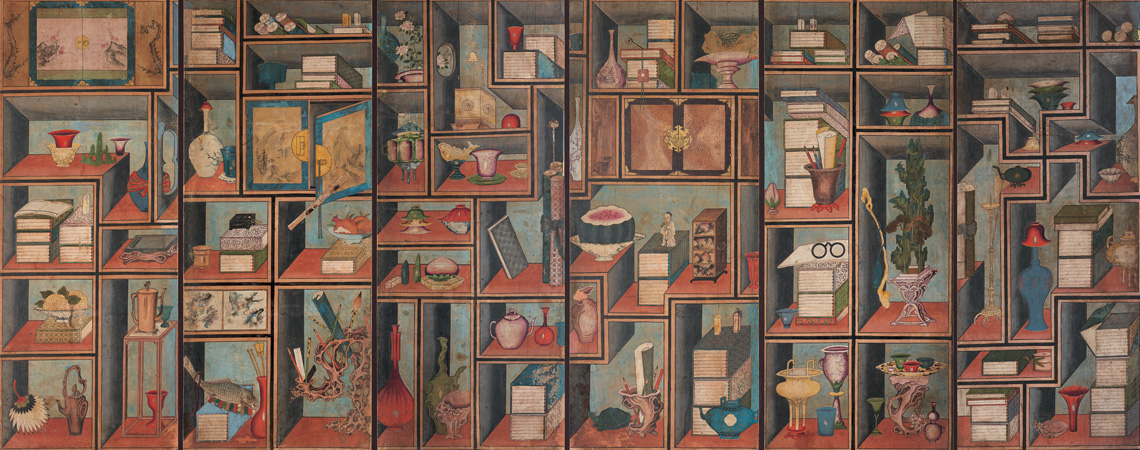

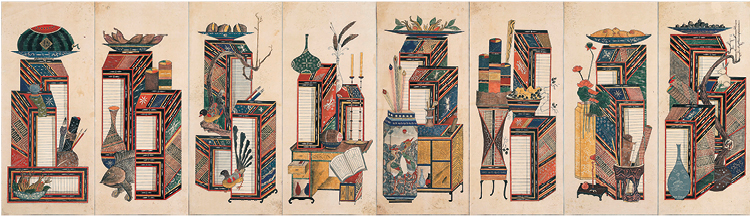

== See also ==
- Byōbu
- Irworobongdo
