= Folding screen =

Furniture

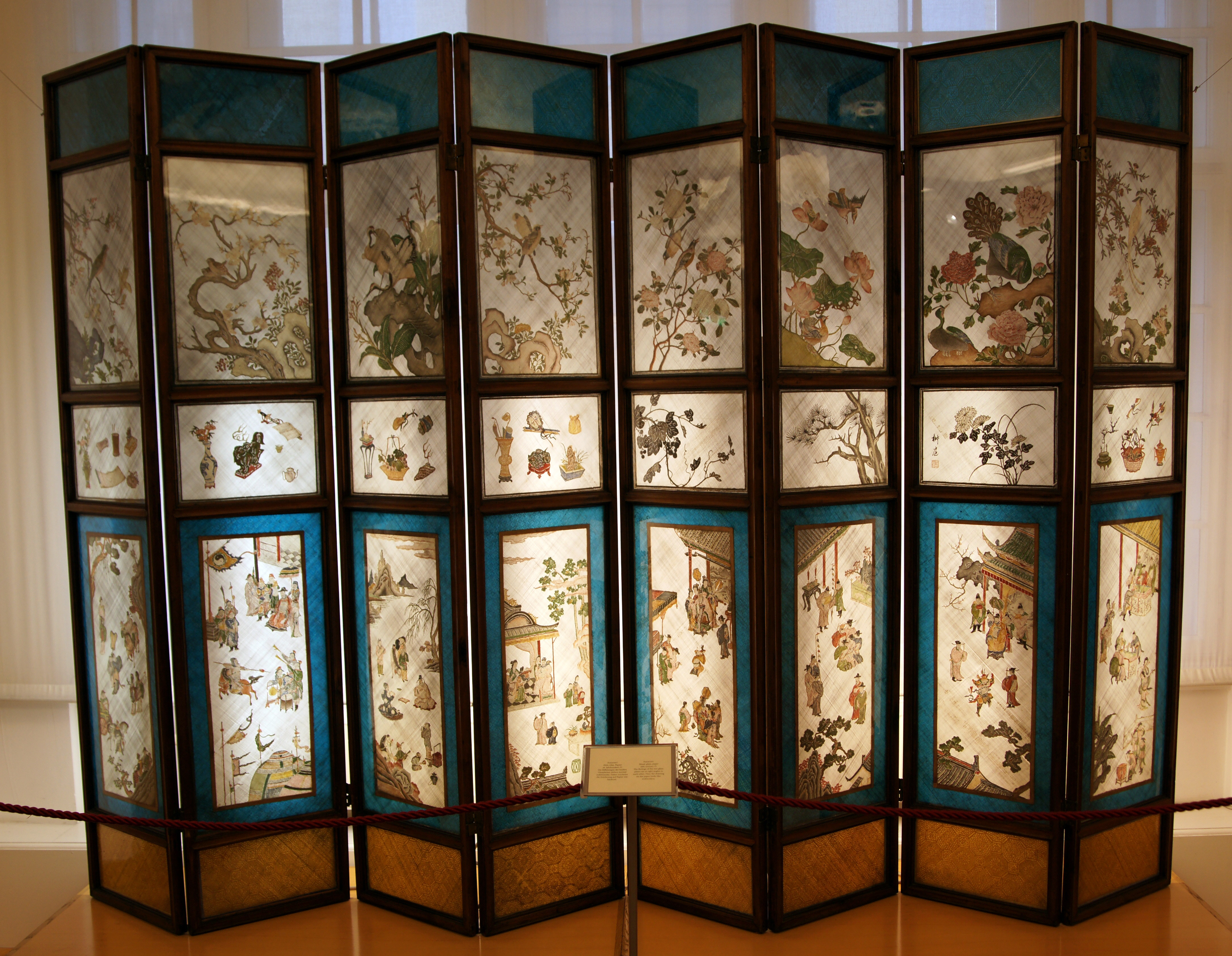
- Chinese folding screen used at the Austrian imperial court, c. 18th century, the Imperial Furniture Collection
- Traditional Chinese: 屏風
- Simplified Chinese: 屏风
- Literal meaning: "Wind Blocker", "Wind Stopper", or "Wind Wall"
Transcriptions
Standard Mandarin
- Hanyu Pinyin: píngfēng

A folding screen, also known as pingfeng (Chinese: 屏風; pinyin: píngfēng), is a type of free-standing furniture consisting of several frames or panels, which are often connected by hinges or by other means. They have practical and decorative uses, and can be made in a variety of designs with different kinds of materials. Folding screens originated from ancient China, eventually spreading to the rest of East Asia, and were popular amongst Europeans.

== History ==
=== Origin ===
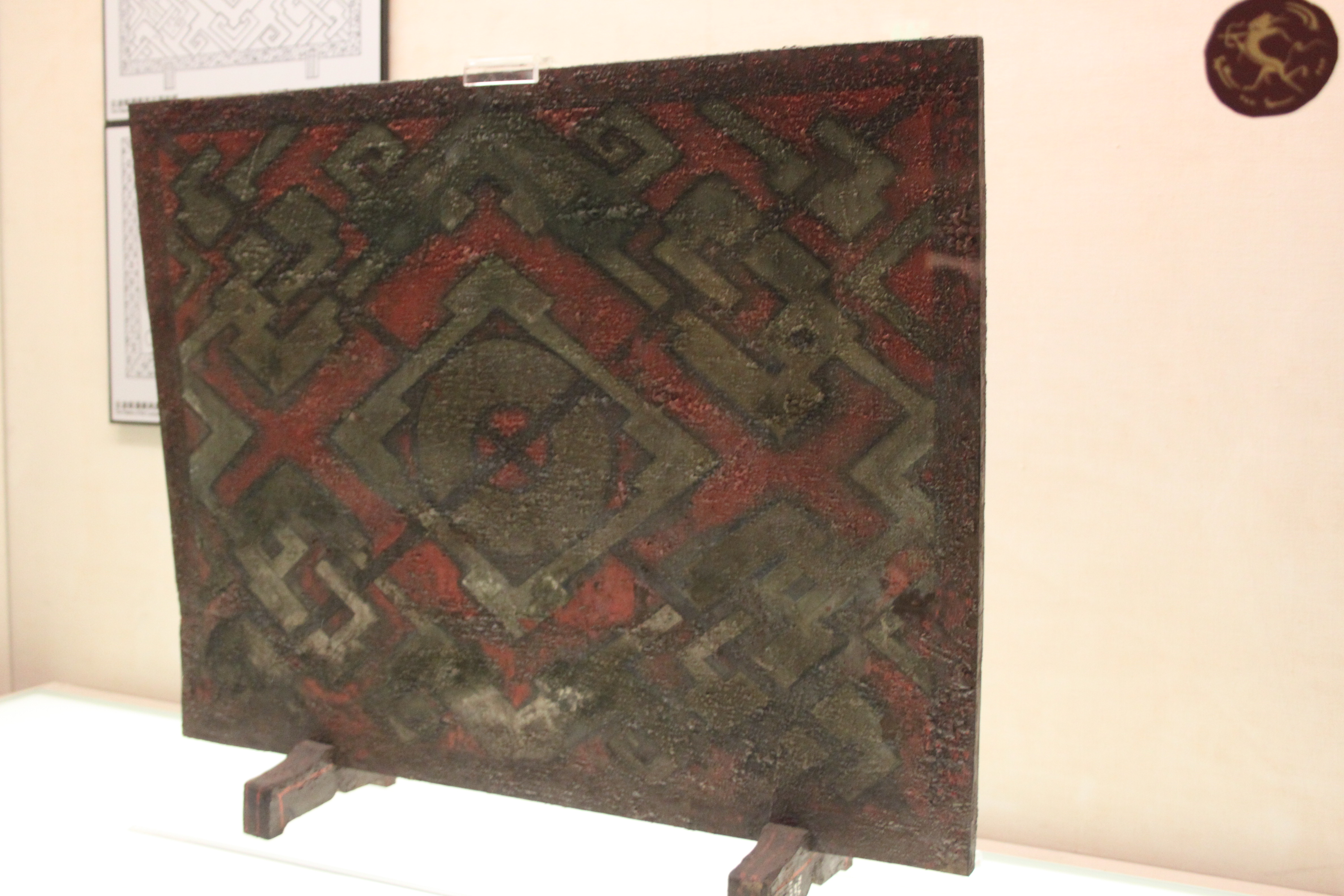
Mawangdui lacquer screen, China, Han dynasty

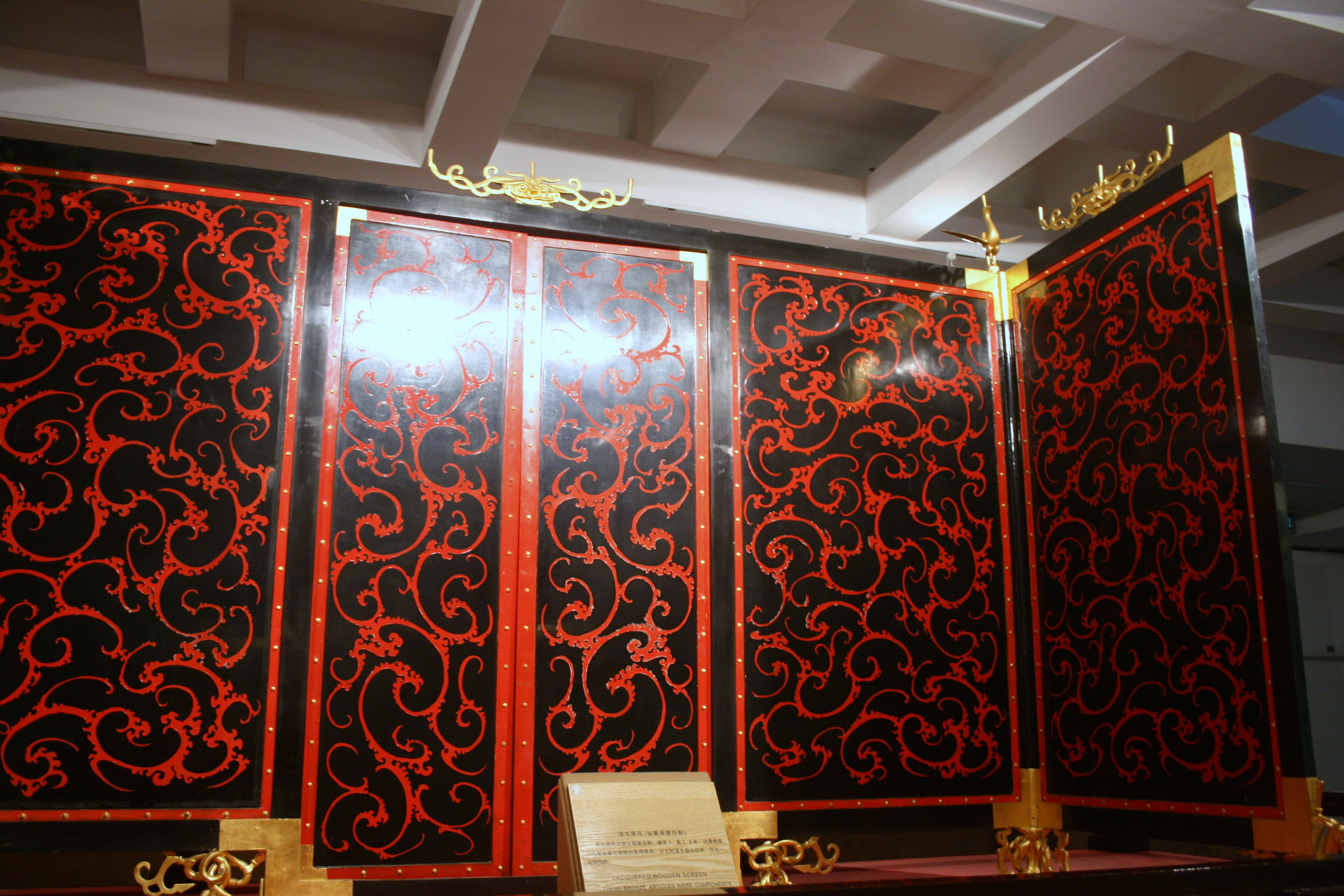
Lacquerware screen of Prince of Nanyue (reconstruction), China, Han dynasty

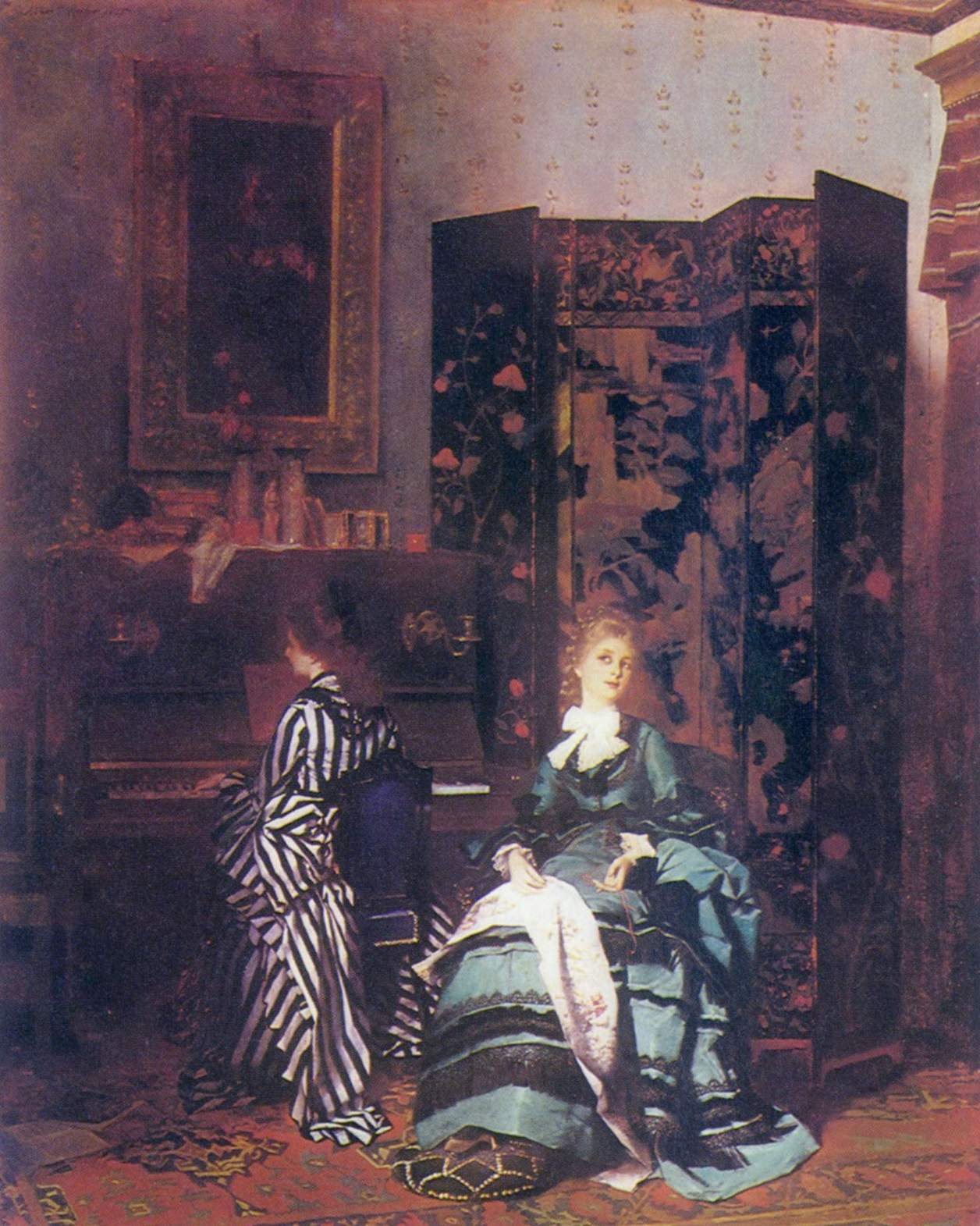
A Chinese Coromandel screen is seen in the oil painting Chopin (1873) by Albert von Keller. Typically for this kind of folding screen, the front has a detailed scene, while the back usually has a simple floral theme.

Screens date back to China during the Eastern Zhou period (771–256 BCE). These were initially one-panel screens in contrast to folding screens. Folding screens were invented during the Han dynasty (206 BCE – 220 CE). Depictions of those folding screens have been found in Han-era tombs, such as one in Zhucheng, Shandong Province.

A folding screen was often decorated with beautiful art; major themes included mythology, scenes of palace life, and nature. It is often associated with intrigue and romance in Chinese literature, for example, a young lady in love could take a curious peek hidden from behind a folding screen. An example of such a thematic occurrence of the folding screen is in the classical novel Dream of the Red Chamber by Cao Xueqin. The folding screen was a recurring element in Tang literature. The Tang poet Li He (790–816) wrote the "Song of the Screen" (屛風曲), describing a folding screen of a newly-wed couple. The folding screen surrounded the bed of the young couple, its twelve panels were adorned with butterflies alighted on China pink flowers (an allusion to lovers), and had silver hinges resembling glass coins.

Folding screens were originally made from wooden panels and painted on lacquered surfaces, eventually folding screens made from paper or silk became popular too. Even though folding screens were known to have been used since antiquity, it became rapidly popular during the Tang dynasty (618–907). During the Tang dynasty, folding screens were considered ideal ornaments for many painters to display their paintings and calligraphy on. Many artists painted on paper or silk and applied it onto the folding screen. There were two distinct artistic folding screens mentioned in historical literature of the era. One of it was known as the huaping (Chinese: 畫屛; lit. 'painted folding screen') and the other was known as the shuping (Chinese: 書屛; lit. 'calligraphed folding screen'). It was not uncommon for people to commission folding screens from artists, such as from Tang-era painter Cao Ba or Song-era painter Guo Xi. The landscape paintings on folding screens reached its height during the Song dynasty (960–1279). The lacquer techniques for the Coromandel screens, which is known as kuancai (款彩 "incised colors"), emerged during the late Ming dynasty (1368-1644) and was applied to folding screens to create dark screens incised, painted, and inlaid with art of mother-of-pearl, ivory, or other materials.

=== Spread throughout East Asia ===
==== Korea ====
The byeongpung (Korean: 병풍; "Folding screen") became significant during the period of Unified Silla (668–935). The most common uses for byeongpung were as decoration, as room dividers, or to block wind caused by draft from the Ondol heated floors which were common across Korea. Commonly depicted on Korean folding screens were paintings of landscapes as well as flowers and artistic renditions of calligraphy. Prominent byeongpung screens known as irworobongdo were important elements in the throne room of some Joseon kings, placed immediately behind the throne. Several examples of irworobongdo can be seen across palaces in Korea such as at Gyeongbok Palace, Changdeok Palace and Changgyeonggung.

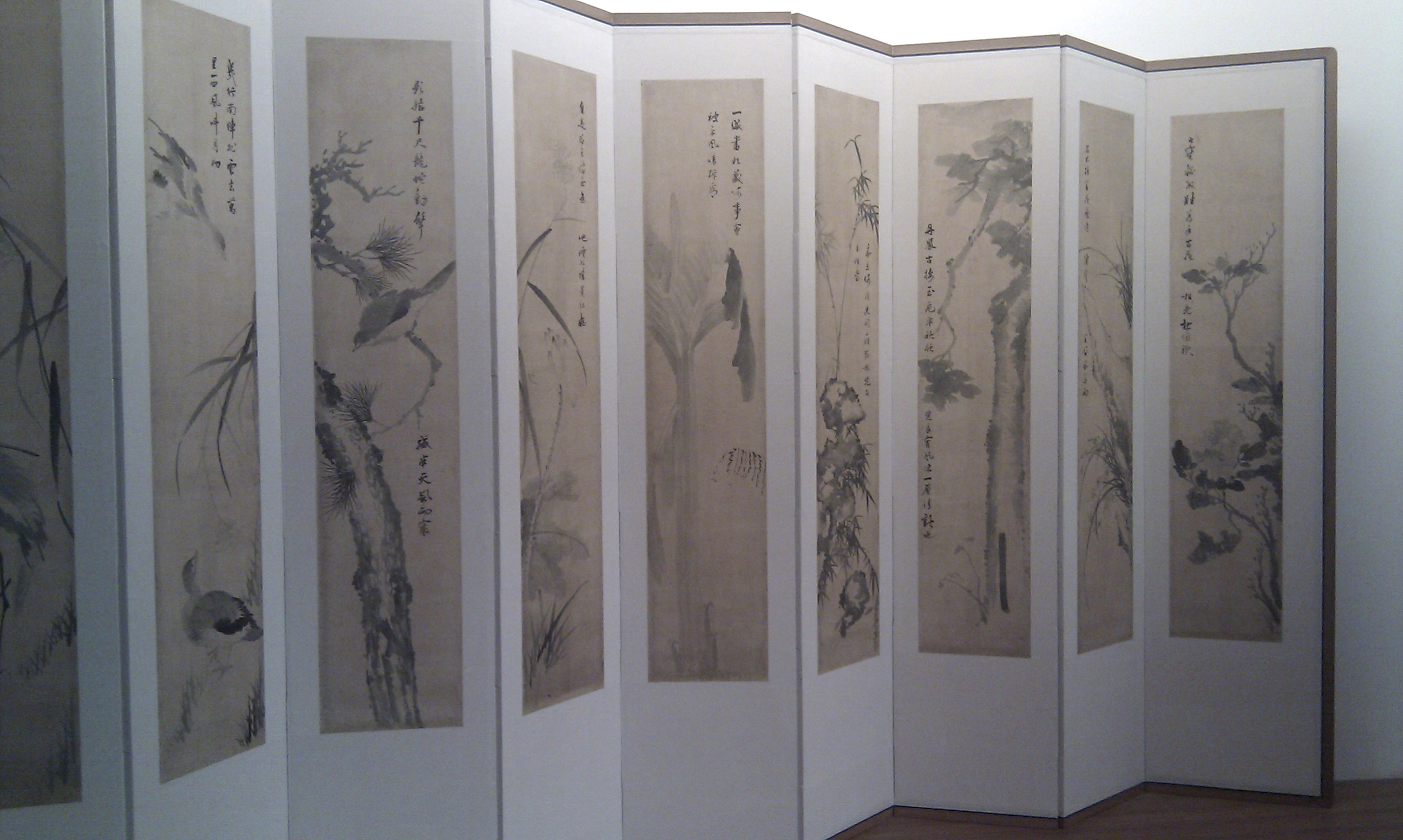
Korean folding screen on display at the Guimet Museum, Paris.

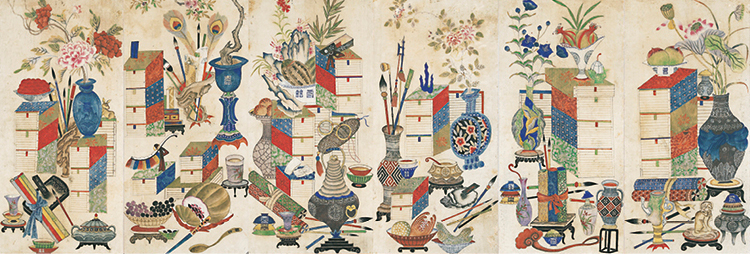
Six-panel chaekgori folding screen, late 1800s.

Another type of screen is the chaekgeori, with scholarly motifs such as books in a shelf.

Common types of byeongpung produced during the Joseon dynasty included:

- Chimbyeong (침병): A folding screen placed by the bedside.
- Baeknapbyeong (백납병): A folding screen decorated with drawings or writings on various subjects.
- Jangsaengdobyeong (장생도병): A folding screen depicting the "Shipjangsaengdo" (10 symbols of longevity)
- Sinseondobyeong (신선도병): A folding screen depicting the gods under the influence of Taoist thought.
- Sobyeong (소병): A folding screen used for mourning or ancestral rites, with only white paper on without any drawings.

==== Japan ====
A Japanese folding screen (or byōbu) originated from the Han dynasty of China and is thought to have been imported to Japan in the 7th or 8th century. The oldest byōbu produced in Japan is Torige ritsujo no byōbu (鳥毛立女屏風) from the 8th century, and it is stored in Shōsōin Treasure Repository. from the Heian period in the 9th century, due to the development of Japan's distinctive Kokufū Bunka (国風文化), the designs became more indigenous and came to be used as furnishings in the architectural style of Shinden-zukuri.

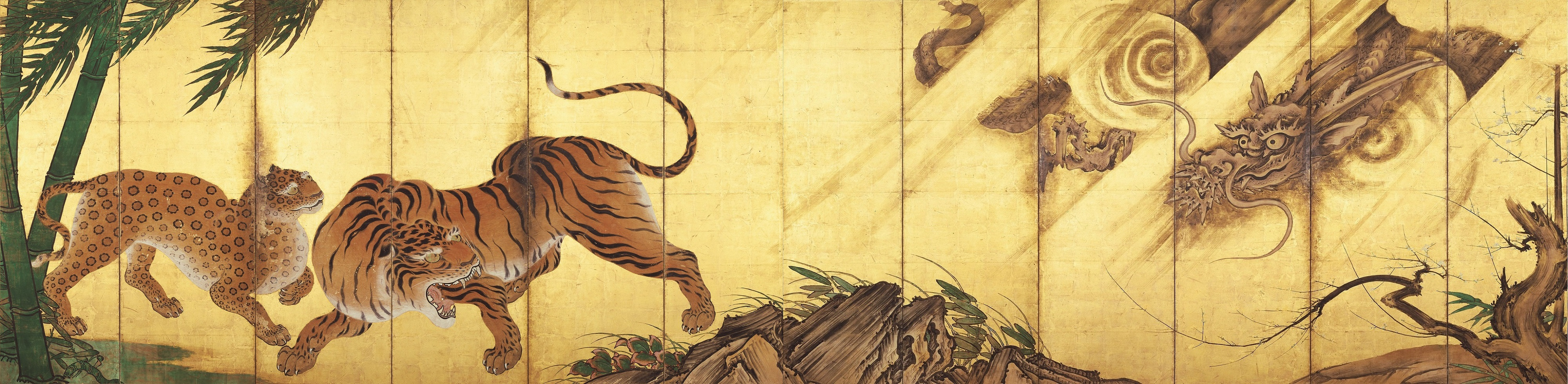
Pair of screens with tigers and dragon by Kanō Sanraku, 17th century, each 1.78 x 3.56 metres.

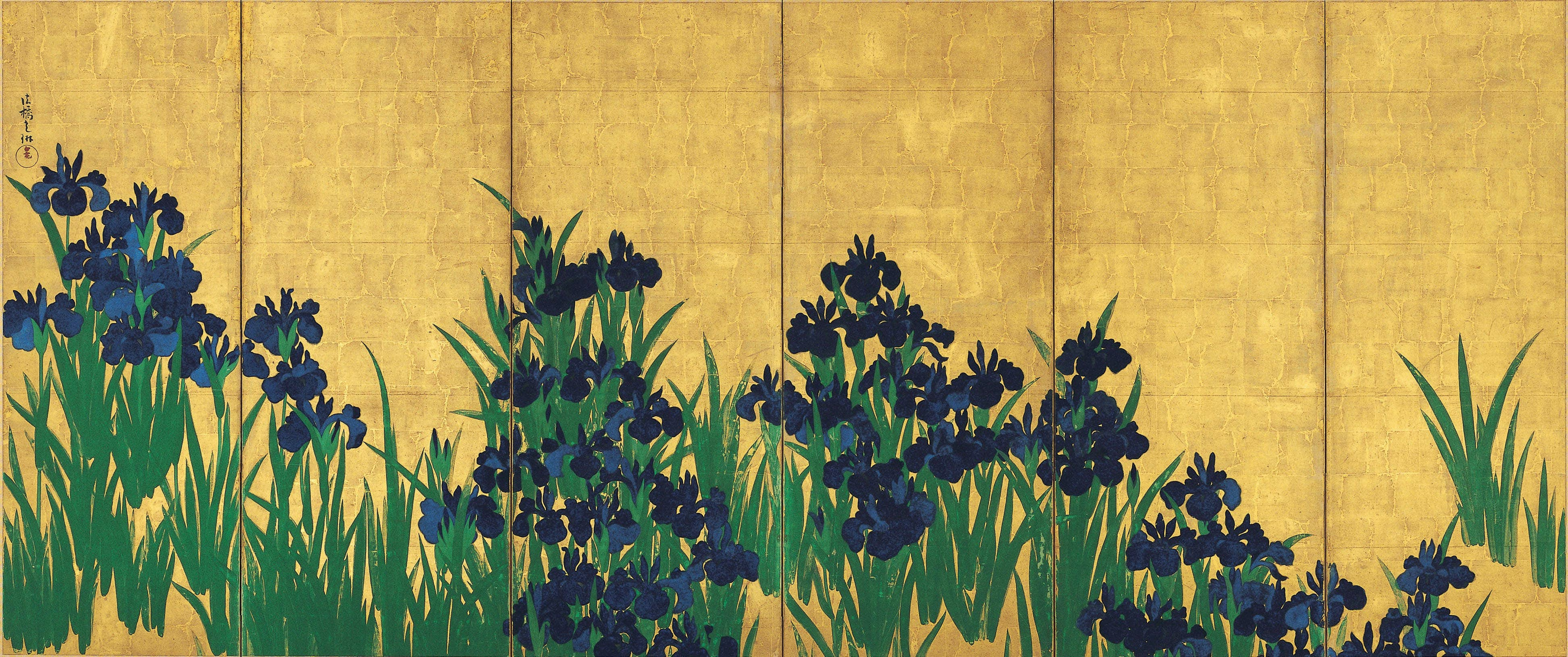
A typical Rinpa school work. Irises, Ogata Kōrin, early 18th century.

The characteristic of folding screens in the Muromachi period was the spatial expression of silence, but in the Azuchi-Momoyama period, when daimyo (feudal lords) competed for supremacy, folding screens with paintings of tigers and dragons became popular. In the Edo period, as the economy developed, emerging merchants became patrons in the production of folding screens. In this period, the Rinpa school folding screens were popular, which were characterized by highly decorative designs using gold or silver foil, bold compositions depicting simple objects, and repeated patterns.

==== Vietnam ====
Folding screens are known as bình phong (屏風) in Vietnamese. They were popular in the Nguyễn dynasty. The folding screens originated from China. Due to Chinese influence, folding screens were brought to Vietnam. Folding screens would have common motifs such as dragons and sceneries. The folding screens are often decorated in a technique called khảm xà cừ (inlaying with crushed nacre). In Vietnam, folding screens have also derived into a type of architecture built in front of houses for protection and luck influenced by feng shui.

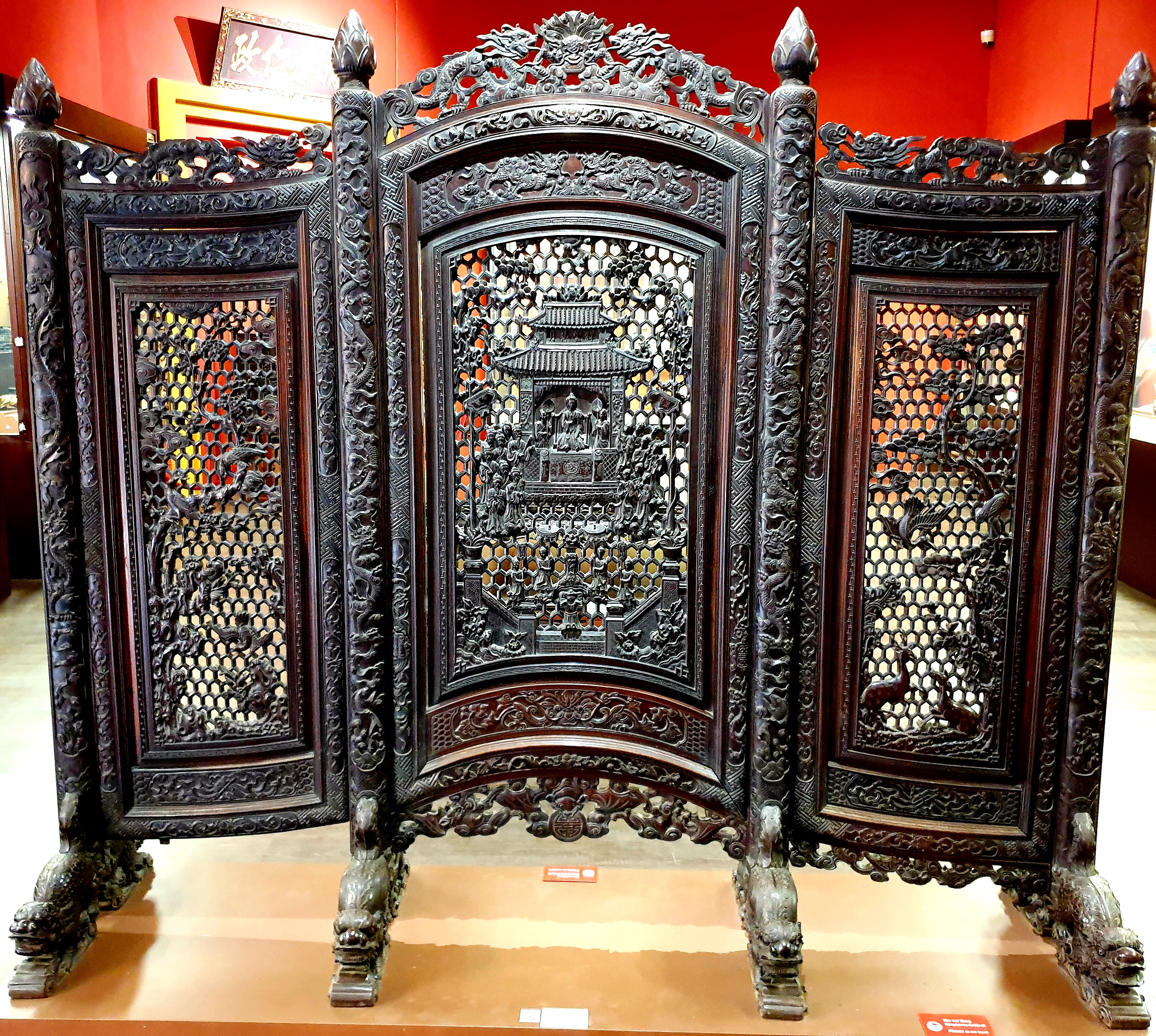
A wooden folding screen from the Nguyễn dynasty, on display at Museum of Vietnamese History.

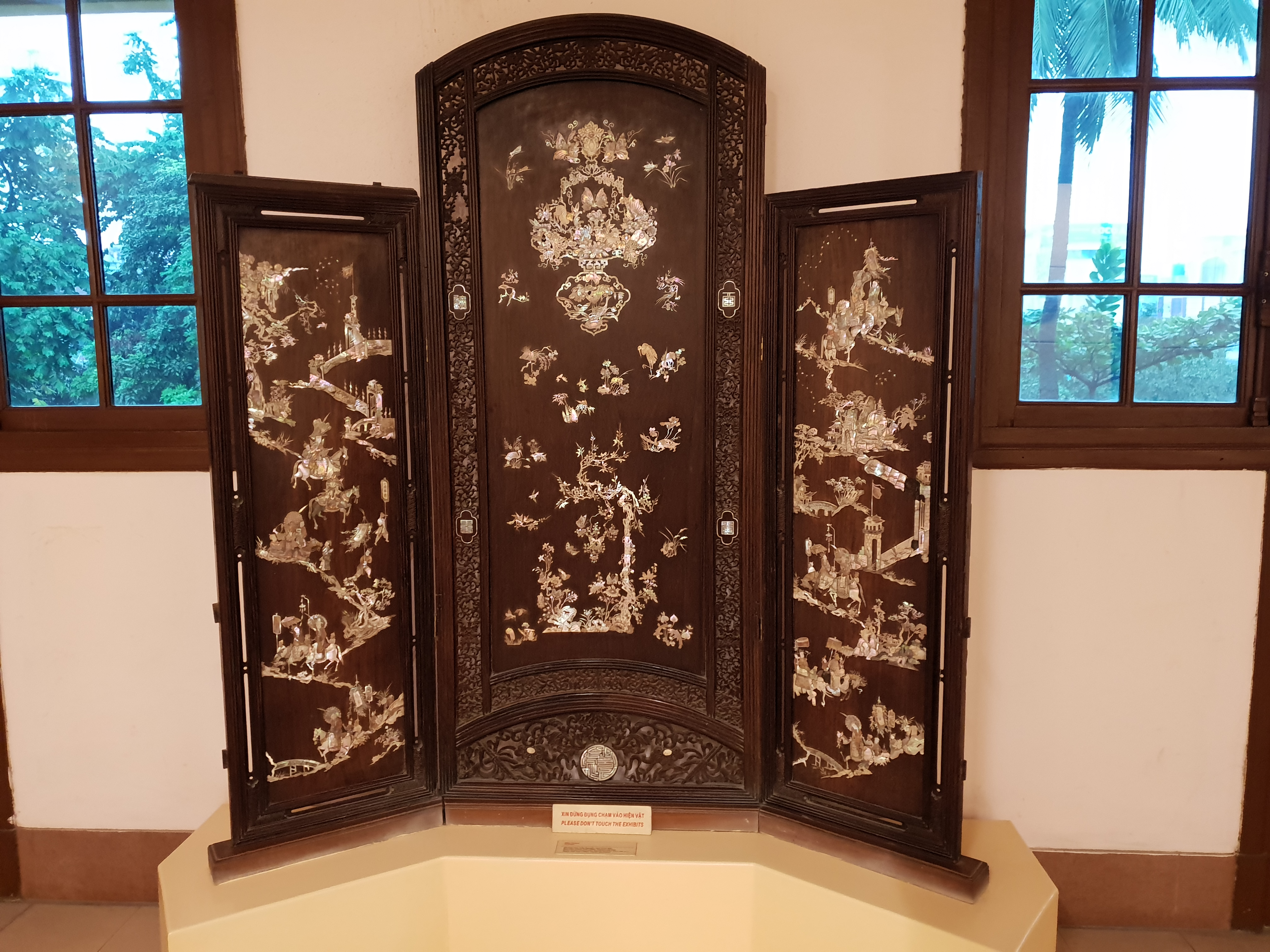
Vietnamese folding screen decorated using the khảm xà cừ technique.

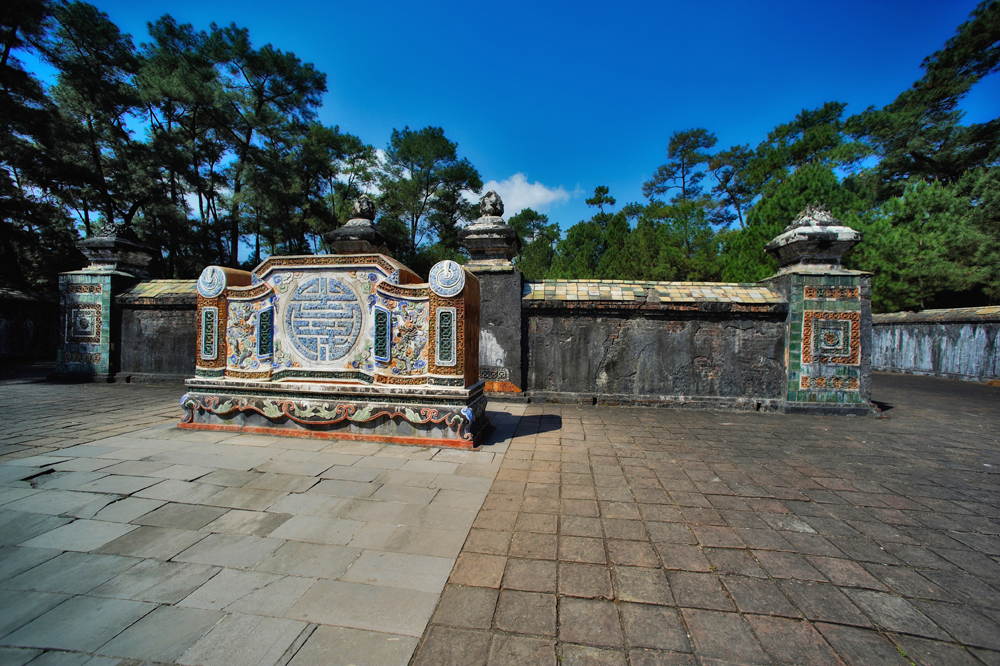
Folding screens in Vietnam derived into a type of architecture built in front of houses for protection in Huế.

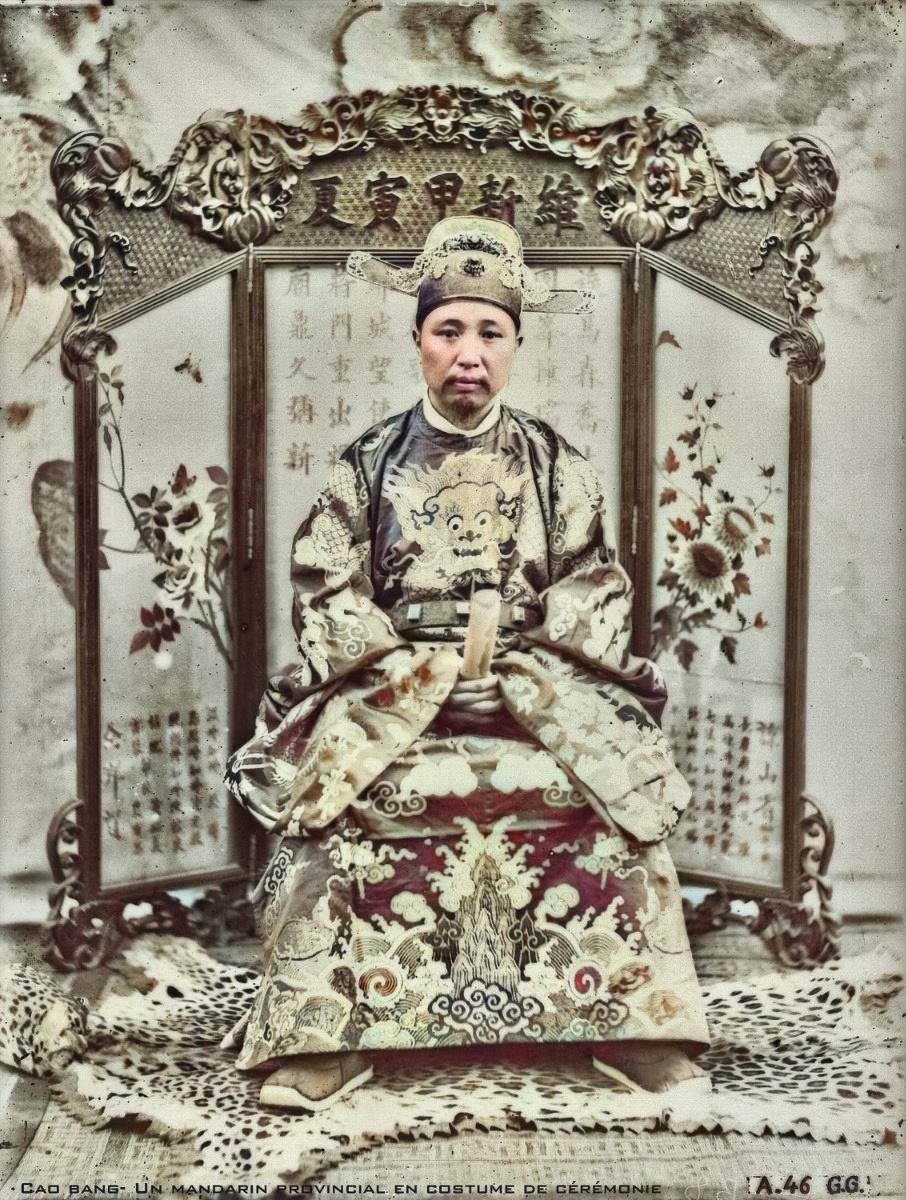
Vi Văn Định (1878–1975), Mandarins of Cao Bằng in front of Bình Phong.

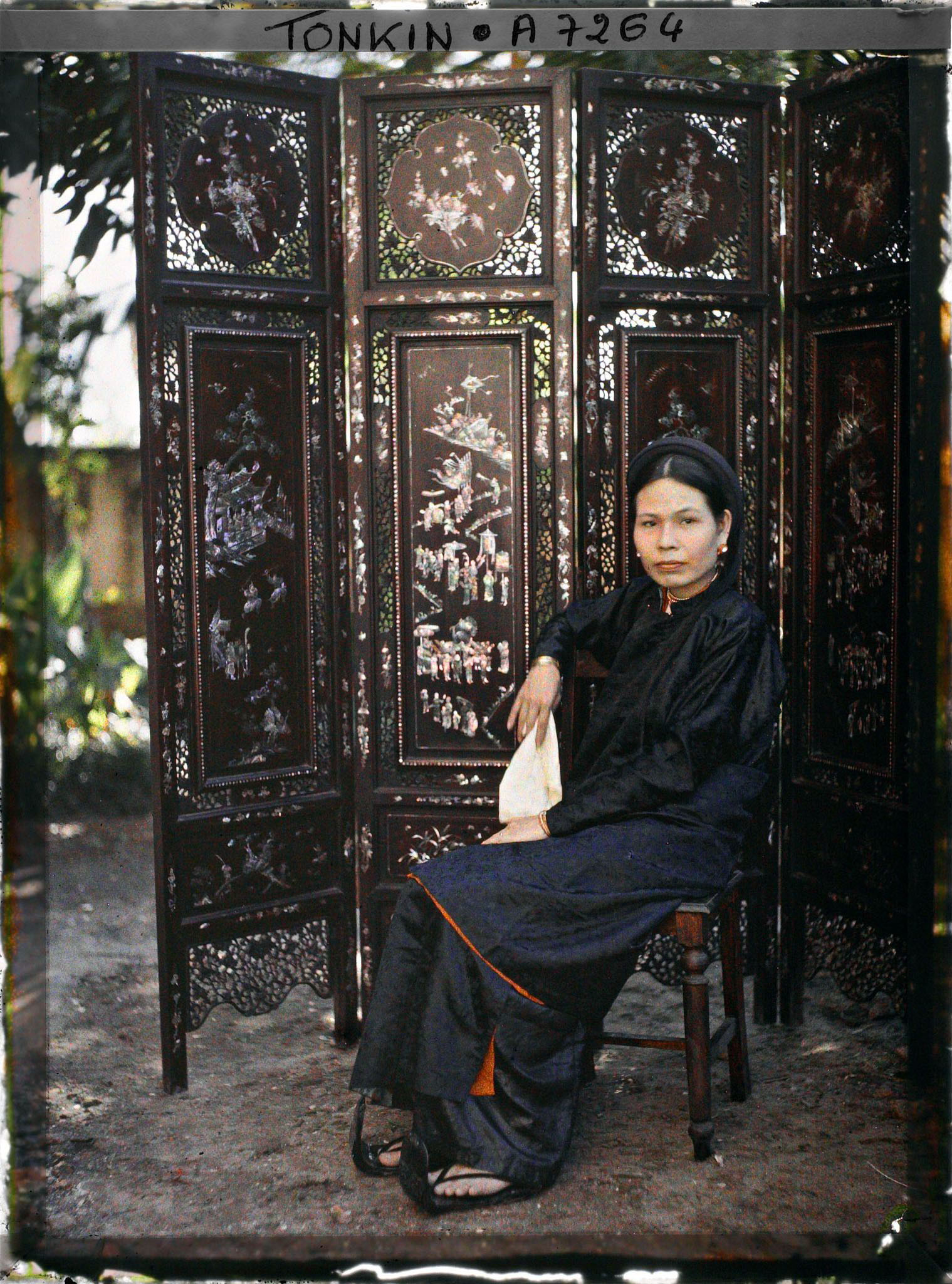
A Vietnamese lady sitting by a folding screen.

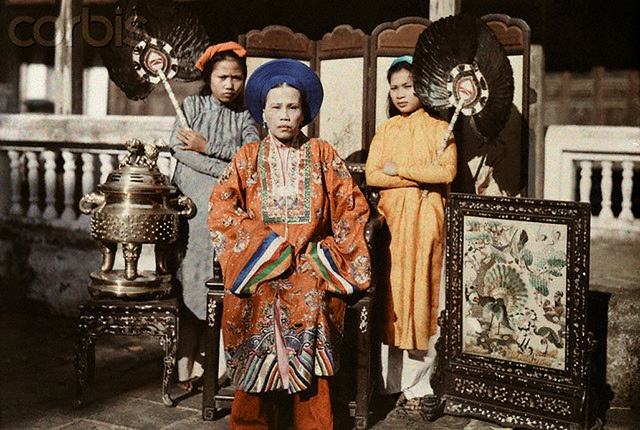
Princess Mỹ Lương, eldest daughter of emperor Dục Đức seated in front of Bình phong

=== Spread to Europe ===
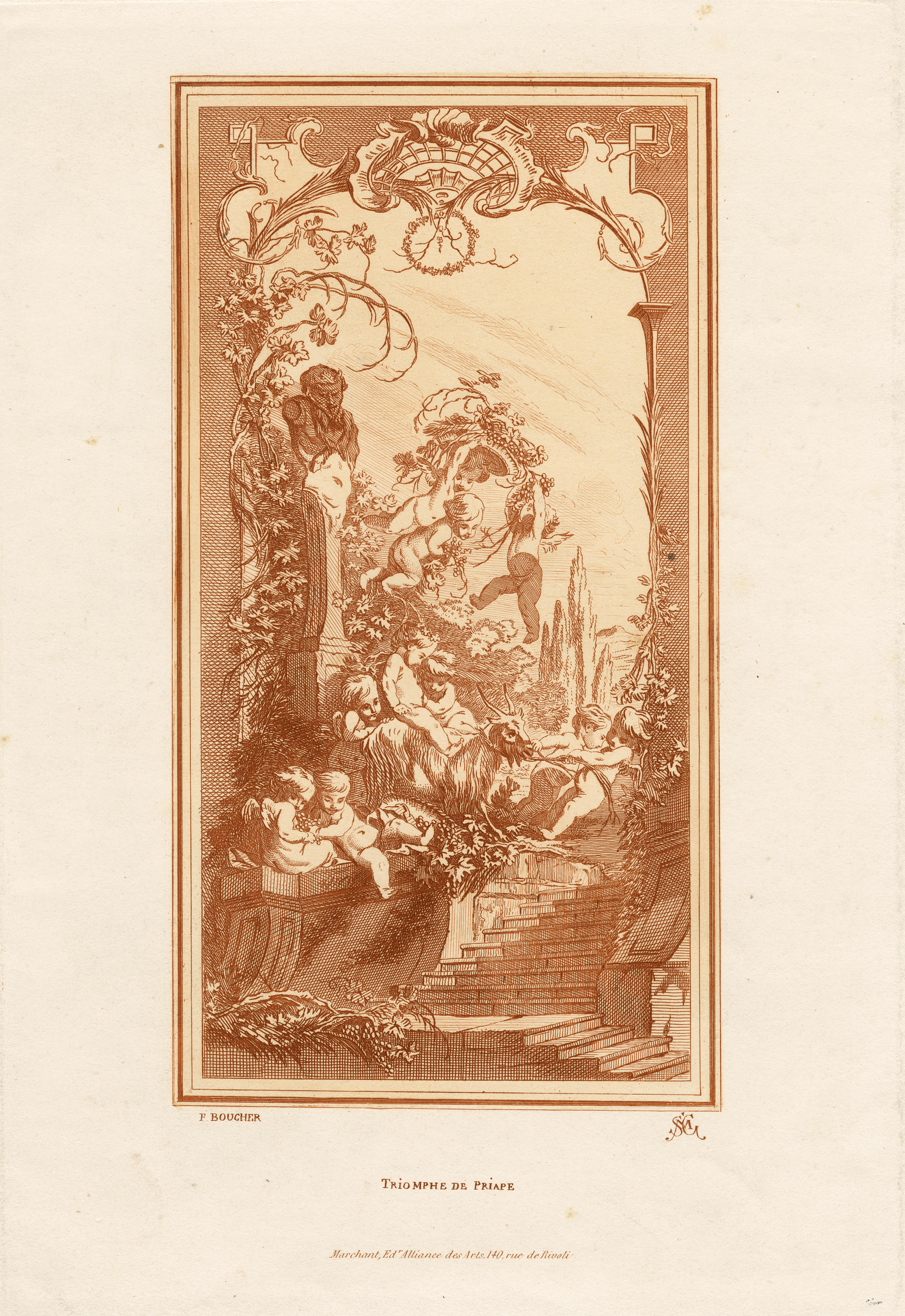
Design for a folding screen panel, Monogrammist SGM after François Boucher, "Triumph of Priapus," 19th century, engraving and etching

Folding screens were introduced in the late Middle Ages to Europe. For example in 1584, a Japanese embassy on behalf of Oda Nobunaga gifted the so-called Azuchi Screens to Pope Gregory XIII, who displayed them in the Vatican. In the 17th and 18th centuries, many folding screens were imported from China to Europe. Europeans and especially the French admired and desired the Chinese folding screens, and began importing large lacquered folding screens adorned with art. The French fashion designer Coco Chanel was an avid collector of Chinese folding screens and is believed to have owned 32 folding screens, of which eight were housed in her apartment at 31 rue Cambon, Paris. She once said:

I've loved Chinese screens since I was eighteen years old. I nearly fainted with joy when, entering a Chinese shop, I saw a Coromandel for the first time. Screens were the first thing I bought.

== Uses ==
Although folding screens originated in China, they can now be found in many interior designs throughout the world. Some of the first uses of folding screens were rather practical. They were used to prevent draft in homes, as indicated by the two characters in their Chinese name: ping (屛 "screen; blocking") and feng (風 "breeze, wind"). They were also used to bestow a sense of privacy; in classical times, folding screens were often placed in rooms to be used as dressing screens for ladies. Folding screens can be set up to partition a large room and change the interior features of the space. Screens may be used as a false wall near the entrance from one room to another to create a desirable atmosphere by hiding certain features like doors to a kitchen. As many folding screens have fine artistic designs and art on them, they can fit well as decorative items in the interior design of a home.

== See also ==
- Chinoiserie
- Coromandel screen
- Hanging scroll
- Rood screen and triptych: panels in churches
- Room divider
- Shower
