= Songseogwon =

Historic area in Seoul, South Korea

Coordinates: 37°34′55.3″N 126°57′59.1″E

Songseogwon (松石園) is the place name for the area around lot 47, Ogin-dong, Jongno-gu, Seoul. The Ongnyudong Valley flowing down from Inwangsan ran through this area, and its outstanding scenery made it a popular destination for yangban and jungin from the mid-Joseon period. In particular, the jungin class led a Wihanng literature movement here: when Cheon Su-gyeong built a house called Songseogwon beside the Ongnyudong Valley and hosted poetry gatherings there, the Okgye Poetry Society (also called the Songseogwon Poetry Society) centered on him became widely celebrated. Following the flourishing of the Songseogwon Poetry Society, the name of the area came to be called Songseogwon rather than Okgye (玉溪), the earlier name for the Ongnyudong Valley.

After Cheon Su-gyeong's death, ownership of Songseogwon changed hands several times—passing through the Shin Andong Kim clan (known as the Jangdong Kims) and the Yeoheung Min clan—before Yun Deok-yeong came to possess Songseogwon around 1910. Yun Deok-yeong purchased more than half the land in Ogin-dong during the Japanese colonial period and built a mansion called Byeoksusanjang (碧樹山莊) on the Songseogwon site, centered on a French-style Western building known as the Yang-gwan (洋館). The Yang-gwan served as the headquarters of the United Nations Commission for the Unification and Rehabilitation of Korea before and after the Korean War, was destroyed by fire in 1966, and was demolished in 1973. After liberation, many houses were built around the Ongnyudong Valley, and residents still refer to the area as Songseogwon.

== History ==
=== 1600s ===
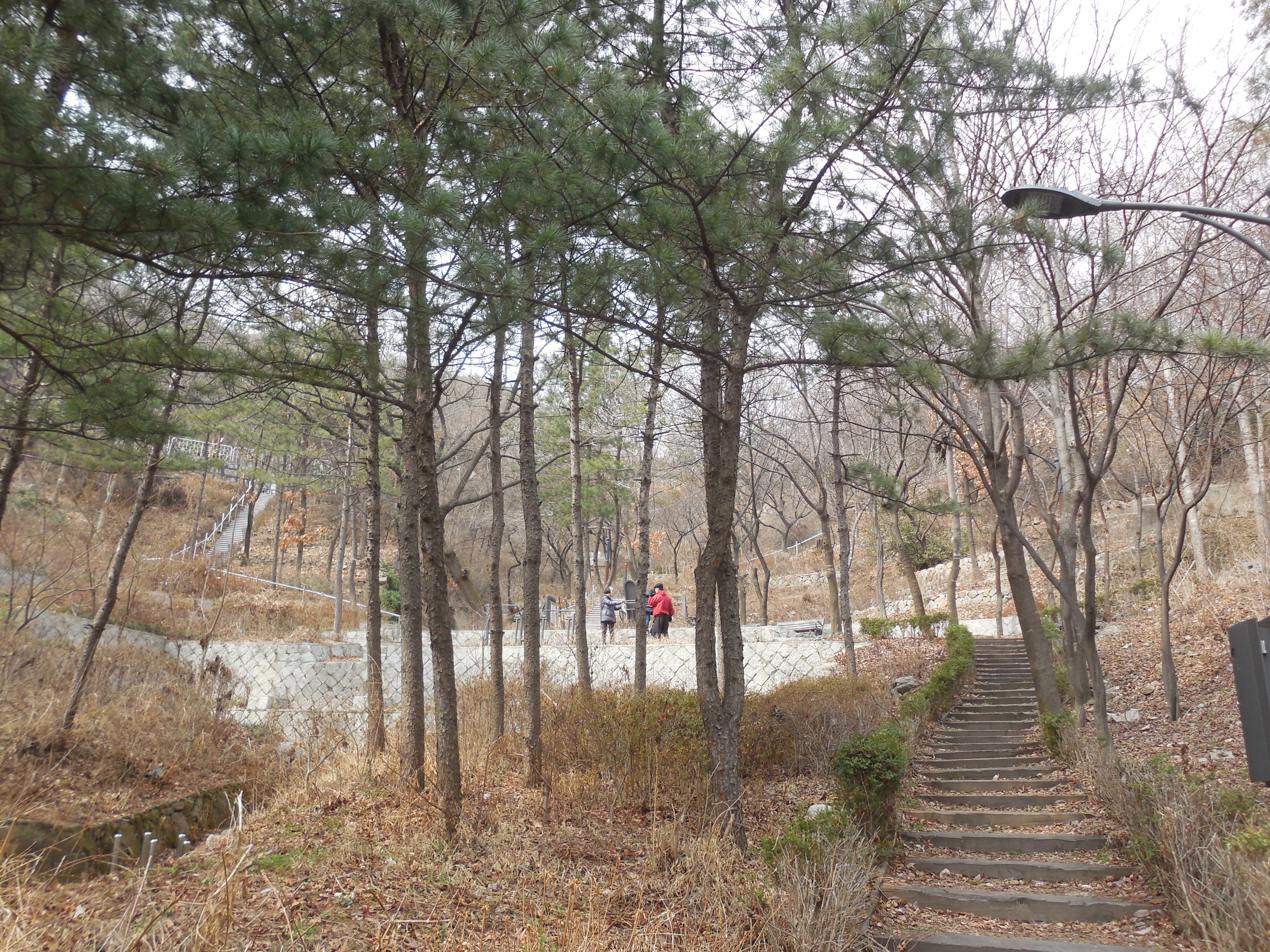
Site of Cheonghwigak

Ongnyucheon is a tributary of Cheonggyecheon, a collective name for the main stream flowing eastward from Suyeongdong Valley and the Ongnyudong (玉流洞) Valley, which flows down from the north and merges with the main stream in front of lot 77-15, Nuha-dong. The Ongnyudong area was home to the Shin Andong Kim clan known as the Jangdong Kims (壯洞金氏), (Note: Jangdong (壯洞) or Janguidong (藏義洞, 壯義洞) was originally the name for the area just across from Cheongpunggye—that is, the present-day Gungjong-dong area.) though they did not originally live in Ongnyudong. The first member of the Jangdong Kim clan to settle near Inwangsan was Kim Sang-yong, who built a villa at Cheongpunggye in 1608. Kim Sang-yong's younger brother Kim Sang-heon lived west of Yuksanggung in what corresponds to the present-day lot 2, Gungjong-dong. In his essay "Yuseosangi" (遊西山記) in his collected works Cheongeumjip, Kim Sang-heon described a visit in the autumn of 1614 to a spring on Inwangsan, having heard it could cure eye ailments after his mother fell ill; he passed the site of So Se-yang's former house, Cheongsimdang (淸心堂), in Inwangdong on his way.

It was Kim Sang-heon's grandson Kim Su-hang who first crossed into Ongnyudong in the late 1600s. In 1683, Kim Su-hang built a house called Yukcheongheon (六靑軒) in Ongnyudong. In 1686, he built a pavilion called Cheonghwigak (淸暉閣) in the yard of Yukcheongheon; to celebrate this, the nearby resident Nam Yong-ik sent a poem, to which Kim Su-hang replied with a poem of his own. Yukcheongheon fell into disuse after Kim Su-hang was put to death in 1689 during the Gisa Hwanguk; later his son Kim Chang-jip rebuilt it as a resting place, but when Kim Chang-jip was also executed in the Sinchuk Oksa, his descendants eventually built a shrine there called Dokchungdang (篤忠堂). Cheonghwigak passed to his son Nogajae (老稼齋) Kim Chang-eop, who rebuilt it in 1715. Behind Cheonghwigak was a well called Gajaewumul (稼齋―, Gajae Well) said to have been enjoyed by Kim Chang-eop, which is the very spring that Kim Sang-heon mentioned in "Yuseosangi." The Gajae Well still exists today at lot 47-376, Ogin-dong, but it functions no longer as a well, as the house built over it covers the well with iron bars and a concrete coating. The location of Yukcheongheon is estimated to have been around lot 47-73, Ogin-dong.

Meanwhile, it was in the 1600s—after the Imjin War—that ordinary people began living in the area west of Gyeongbokgung, with the yangban class settling mainly on higher ground and the jungin class—scribes (書吏) and gyeongajeon (京衙前, local government functionaries)—gathering on lower ground. These jungin formed poetry clubs called sisa and developed the Wihanng literature movement. While the first such gathering in Wihanng literature, the Pungwol-hyangdo (風月香徒), centered on Samcheongdong at the foot of Bugaksan, the Naksa (洛社) founded by Im Jun-won (林俊元) held gatherings not only below Bugaksan but also at the Ongnyudong Valley on Inwangsan and at Pirundae. (Note: Pungwol-hyangdo was active in the mid-1500s, and Naksa in the mid-to-late 1600s.)

=== 1700s ===
In the 1700s, the Ongnyudong Valley area was dotted with houses belonging to both the Jangdong Kims and jungin residents; Wihanng poets had already lived in the Ongnyudong area for several generations. Among them, thirteen poets including Jang Hon, Cheon Su-gyeong, Kim Nak-seo (金洛瑞), Im Deuk-myeong (林得明), Kim Tae-han (金泰漠), and No Yun-jeok (盧允迪) gathered on July 16, 1786 at the Ongnyudong Valley where Cheon Su-gyeong lived, and founded a poetry society called Okgyesa (玉溪社) or Okgye Poetry Society (玉溪詩社). At the time, Cheon Su-gyeong used the pen name Jeog-yeojae (積餘齋). When Cheon Su-gyeong built a thatched cottage beneath a pine tree and a large boulder in the early 1790s and named it Songseogwon (松石園), the Okgye Poetry Society came to be known as the Songseogwon Poetry Society (松石園詩社). Jang Hon also followed Cheon Su-gyeong to Ongnyudong, building a house called Iieom (而已广) and joining the poetry society. Their poetry gathering held on Yudu (流頭) Day in 1791 survives in illustrated form in the Okgye Cheong-yu Cheop (玉溪淸遊帖), with paintings by Yi In-mun and Kim Hong-do.

After the Okgye Poetry Society came to be called the Songseogwon Poetry Society, it was regarded as the representative sisa of Wihanng literature. It was famous enough that poets of the time who had not participated in it considered it a disgrace. The Songseogwon Poetry Society originally held poetry gatherings (詩會, sihoe) on a small scale; as numbers grew, it held baekjeon (白戰, paper battles) every spring and autumn at the Yeongtang (蓮堂) of the Jungsebu (中書府), where anywhere from 30–50 to several hundred jungin composed poetry. The baekjeon—named for fighting with sheets of paper instead of weapons—was so popular that anyone caught by night watchmen claimed to be going to a baekjeon and was let go. As the Songseogwon Poetry Society's baekjeon became so famous as to symbolize Wihanng literature, the entire area around Cheon Su-gyeong's house gradually came to be called Songseogwon. Songseogwon's outstanding scenery of pine trees and boulders also attracted attention from yangban literati. The Seosa (西社), formed by Ma Seong-rin and others in the mid-1700s and gathering at Pirundae, also exchanged with the Songseogwon Poetry Society from 1791 following an invitation from Cheon Su-gyeong; in September 1792, Seosa members joined Cheon Su-gyeong to re-establish the Gurosi-gye (九老詩契) poetry fellowship.

=== 1800s ===
In the fourth lunar month of 1817, Kim Jeong-hui carved the characters '松石園' (Songseogwon) horizontally on a boulder behind where the Songseogwon Poetry Society had gathered, and added the inscription 'Jeongchuk cheong-hwa-wol soboengnaeseo' (丁丑淸和月小蓬萊書) alongside it. The Songseogwon rock carving was cut as a square with sides of four chon (寸) each. The current location of this carving is unclear; in Kim Yeong-sang's Seoul 600 Years, it is merely noted as carved on "a fairly large cliff rock at roughly the midpoint inside the Songseogwon enclosure." Residents estimate the carving was at lot 47-253, Ogin-dong. Choe Jong-hyeon, by contrast, believed the carving had been carved on the stepped rock face behind Park No-su's house and is now buried under soil. Seo Yong-taek testified that it was plastered over with cement along with the boulder and has disappeared. (Note: Seo Yong-taek (徐龍澤) was a person who handled clerical administration for the Irrigation Association under the U.S. Military Government from 1946 to 1948, and lived at the Sosil Daek after liberation.) However, by the time Kim Jeong-hui carved the inscription, the Songseogwon Poetry Society was already in decline; after Cheon Su-gyeong died in 1818, it all but disappeared.

Afterwards, Kim Su-geun purchased the old site of Songseogwon and rebuilt Cheonghwigak, so that the area around Cheonghwigak came to be called Songseogwon. As the Jangdong Kims lost power in the 1860s and the Yeoheung Min clan rose to the center of monarchical rule backed by Empress Myeongseong, Songseogwon was transferred to Min Tae-ho and Min Gyu-ho in the 1870s. Kim Hak-jin, a member of the Jangdong Kims, later recorded that Min Gyu-ho had said he wanted to drink the water of the Gajae Well and that there was no choice but to hand over Songseogwon. Subsequently, Min Yeong-ik, Min Yeong-so, and Min Yeong-rin each successively owned Songseogwon.

=== After 1900 ===
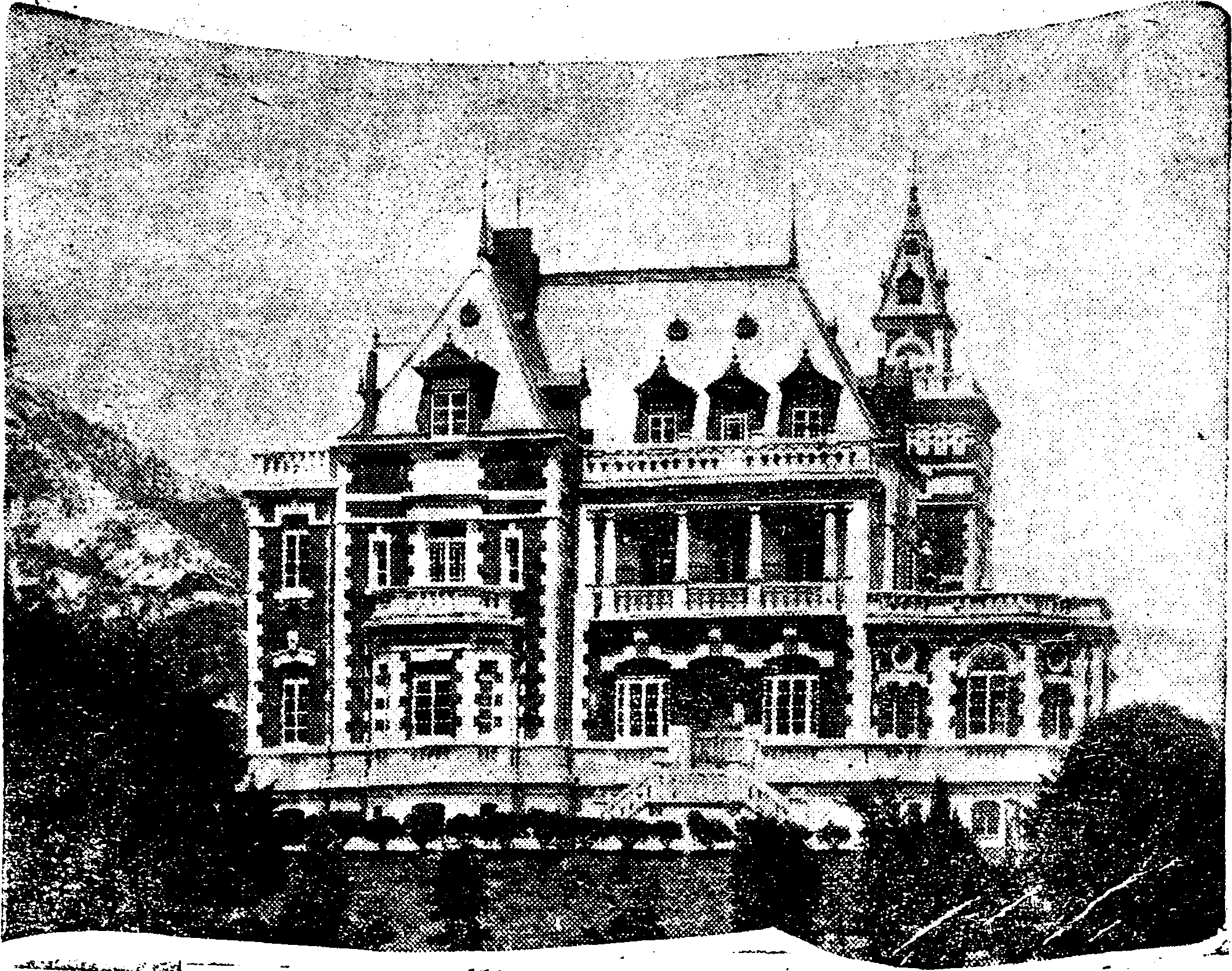
The Yang-gwan of Byeoksusanjang (1926)

The Songseogwon area was sold off in 1904 following the death of Empress Sunjeonghyo. Go Je-ik (高濟翊) purchased it, and it was then acquired by Yang Seong-hwan (梁性煥). Then Yun Deok-yeong, using 460,000 won in grace money (恩賜金) given by Japan, purchased the Songseogwon area around the winter solstice of 1910. Yun Deok-yeong continued buying up land in Ogin-dong, and by 1917 owned 49.5% (16,628 pyeong) of the total land area of Ogin-dong, rising to 53.54% (19,467.8 pyeong) by 1927.

Based on the design of a French aristocratic villa that Min Yeong-chan had seen in France, Yun Deok-yeong commenced construction of a mansion on his Ogin-dong land in 1913. However, importing expensive materials from overseas caused many contractors to go bankrupt, and even as late as 1921 the exterior was complete but the building remained unfinished; it was known as "the most extravagant house in Joseon" and "the Epang-gung" (阿房宮). The Byeoksusanjang Yang-gwan was finally completed in 1935, but was immediately leased to the World Red Swastika Society Korea Branch; after Yun Deok-yeong's death, Yun Gang-ro sold the building and site in their entirety to Mitsui Mining Co., Ltd. in 1945. Yun Deok-yeong officially worked in a small Western-style building behind the Yang-gwan, but as he served as head of the World Red Swastika Society Korea Branch, it is also possible he effectively used the Yang-gwan. After liberation, the Yang-gwan was used as Deoksu Hospital; during the Korean War, it served as quarters for U.S. 8th Army officers; from June 1954, the United Nations Commission for the Unification and Rehabilitation of Korea (UNCURK) used it as its headquarters until it was destroyed by fire during renovation work on April 5, 1966. UNCURK immediately moved its offices to the Diplomatic Research Institute building and the Yang-gwan was managed by the Government General Administration before being demolished in June 1973.

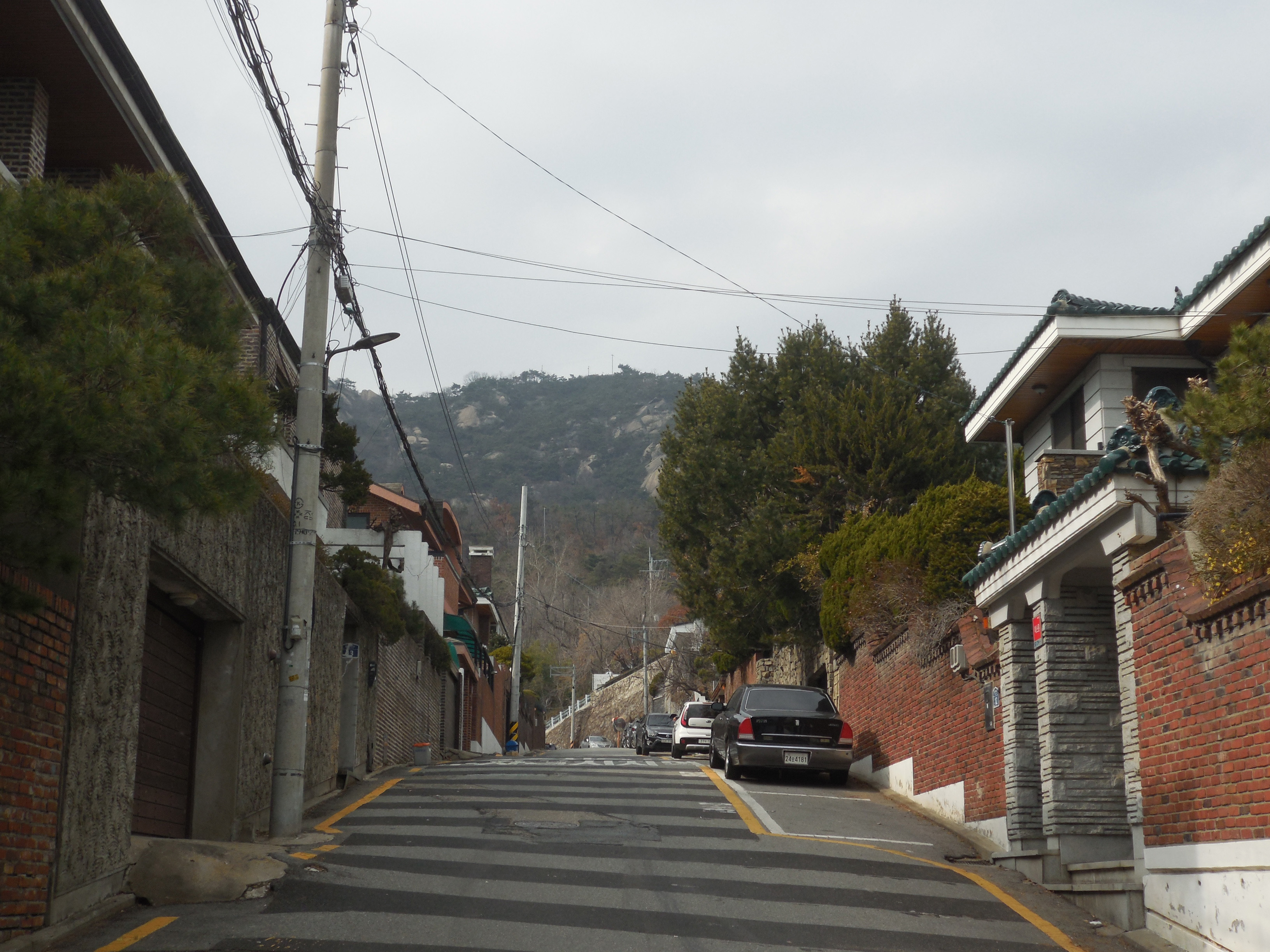
The upscale residential street known as 'Eongkeongkeu-gil'

The site left after demolishing the Yang-gwan passed to Seoul Trust Bank in 1978 and was subdivided into large lots, developed as an upscale residential area in the late 1970s. The alley running through this residential area, Pirundae-ro 9-gil, is known as 'Eongkeongkeu-gil', a pronunciation shift from 'UNCURK'. In contrast, the rest of lot 47, Ogin-dong—that is, the area around the Ongnyudong Valley—was settled by refugees from the Korean War and people from rural provinces coming to Seoul. The area is characterized by unlicensed substandard housing mostly roofed with corrugated asbestos sheets and an irregular lot numbering system. Lot 47, Ogin-dong was neglected in its deteriorated state: city gas had not yet arrived as recently as the early 2000s, and many houses had collapsed tiles or walls. On December 27, 2007, it was designated the Ogin 1st Residential Redevelopment Improvement Zone, but this designation was lifted on March 30, 2017 to preserve historical and cultural resources; as a follow-up measure, a Residential Environment Improvement Project Zone was designated on July 25, 2019.

== Byeoksusanjang ==
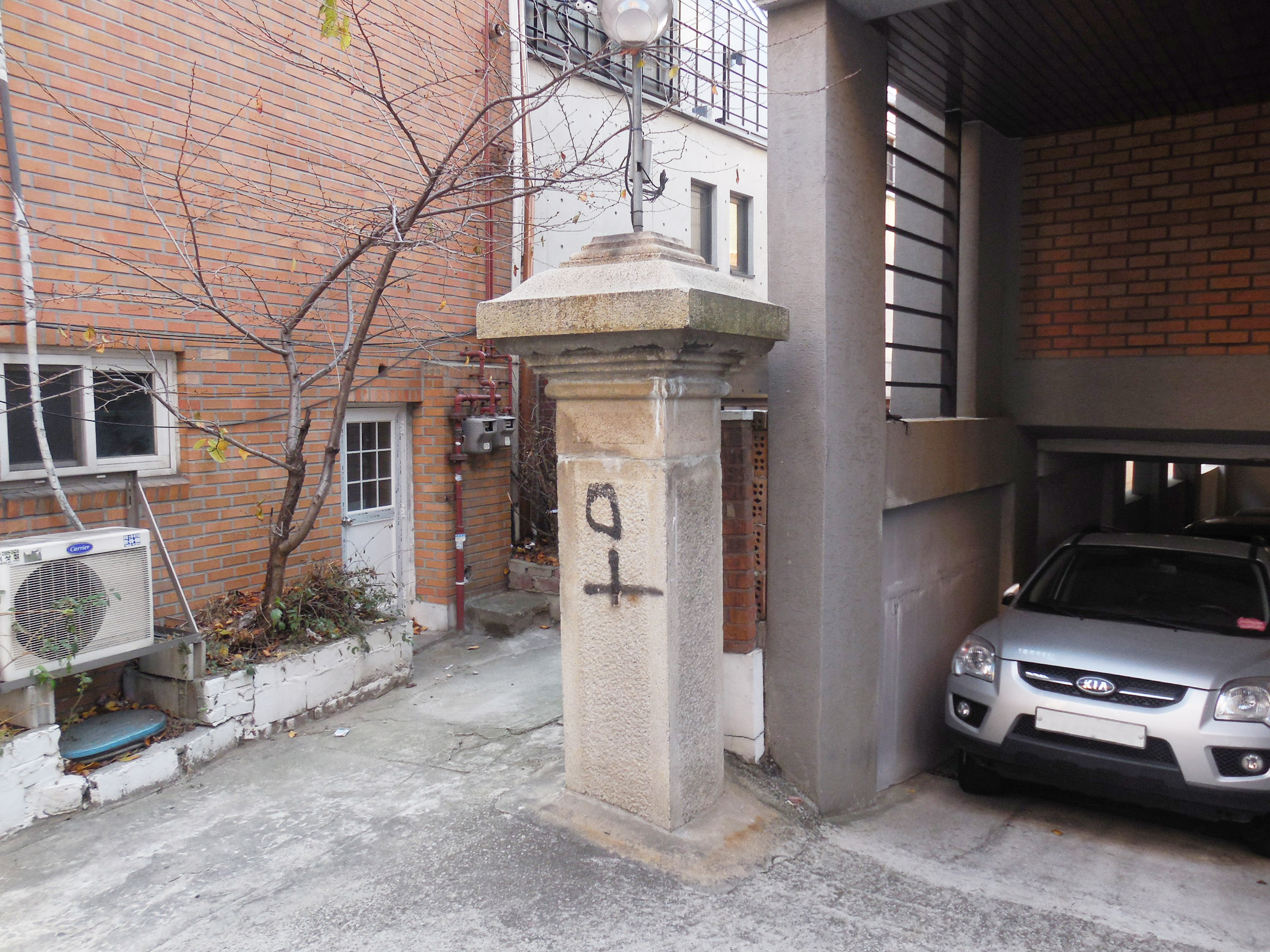
A surviving gatepost of Byeoksusanjang

Byeoksusanjang was famous for the Yang-gwan, which no longer survives as it was destroyed by fire. Surviving outbuildings include the Seo Yong-taek house and the Park No-su house. In addition, three of the original four Byeoksusanjang gateposts survive—one at lot 47-27 and two at lot 47-33, Ogin-dong. On the east side of the building at lot 62, Ogin-dong, traces of Byeoksusanjang's brick wall and archway remain. Some residents took materials from Byeoksusanjang after the fire and used them to build houses; in one such house, a stone staircase railing carved with a taeguk pattern survives. Other houses have stone pieces that appear to be scaled-down reproductions of the gateposts, or stones used in railings or gardens.

=== Yang-gwan ===
A three-story Western-style building with one basement level, it stood at what are now lots 47-479, 47-481, 47-487, and 47-488, Ogin-dong. Built in dark brown brick modeled after a French mansion, the building used stone materials sparingly for columns, windows, and quoins alongside the brick, creating a color contrast. Built with architectural materials imported from Germany, after liberation the building was also known as 'Ppyojukdang' (the Pointed Building) because of a spire resembling that of Myeongdong Cathedral, and 'Geumbuneogijip' (the Goldfish House) because a glass aquarium housing goldfish had been installed in the reception room ceiling during the colonial period. It stood prominently on the slopes of Inwangsan, overlooking central Gyeongseong (Seoul). According to the 1914 architectural drawings, the building name of the Yang-gwan of Byeoksusanjang was written as Okdong Baengmiwon Singeongok (玉洞百美園新建屋).

=== Iryang-jeong ===
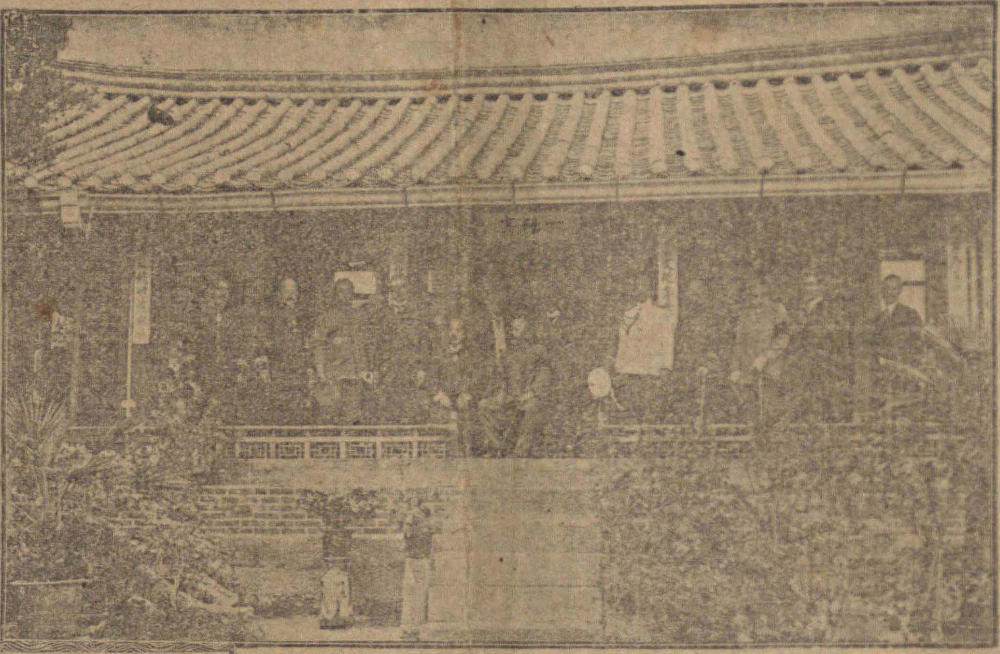
Iryang-jeong (1913)

Iryang-jeong (日陽亭) was a building newly constructed by Yun Deok-yeong under the pretense of succeeding Cheonghwigak, serving as the sarangchae (men's quarters) of the main hanok building located behind the Yang-gwan. Despite the name 'jeong (亭)', it was not a pavilion but a hanok built on a raised platform of dressed stone and brick, with poetic inscriptions (churyeon) hung on each of its five columns. Based on its relationship with Cheonghwigak, Choe Jong-hyeon estimated it was at lot 47-383, Ogin-dong; Kim Hae-gyeong, based on a 1915 topographic map, estimated it was at lots 47-269 and 47-161, Ogin-dong. According to Song Tae-jun, who was the block leader of Ogin-dong in 1984, Iryang-jeong was demolished in 1969; according to Seo Yong-taek, it was demolished in 1946. Additionally, a now-demolished two-story wooden building with a floor area of 175 pyeong existed around lot 47-73, Ogin-dong and is believed to have served as the main building based on its location.

=== Sosil Daek ===
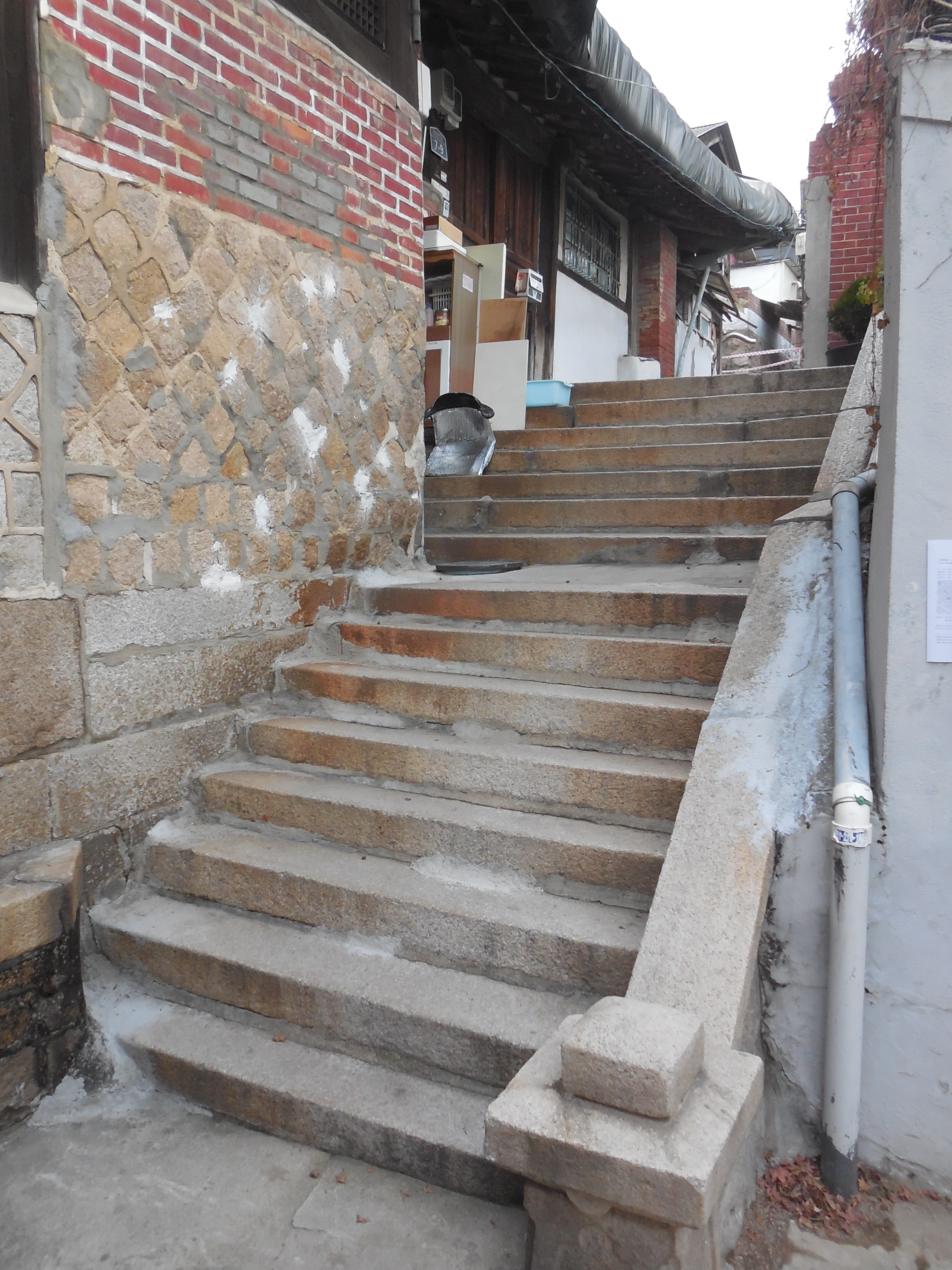
Entrance to the Seo Yong-taek house

The house where Yun Deok-yeong's concubine (小室) Lady Yi (李姓女) lived was called 'Sosil Daek' (Concubine's House). A hanok built in 1919, it was once incorrectly identified as the home of Empress Sunjeonghyo. After liberation, the Sosil Daek was national property; in 1955, Seo Yong-taek purchased part of it, and in 1990 his share was divided and sold to several people. The Sosil Daek was shared at its peak by up to 13 households, with partial additions and modifications causing it to deteriorate; as of 2010, seven households were sharing the property. The stone staircase leading up to the Sosil Daek features Japanese-style decorations. Namsangol Hanok Village has a hanok built as a replica of this house.

=== Park No-su house ===
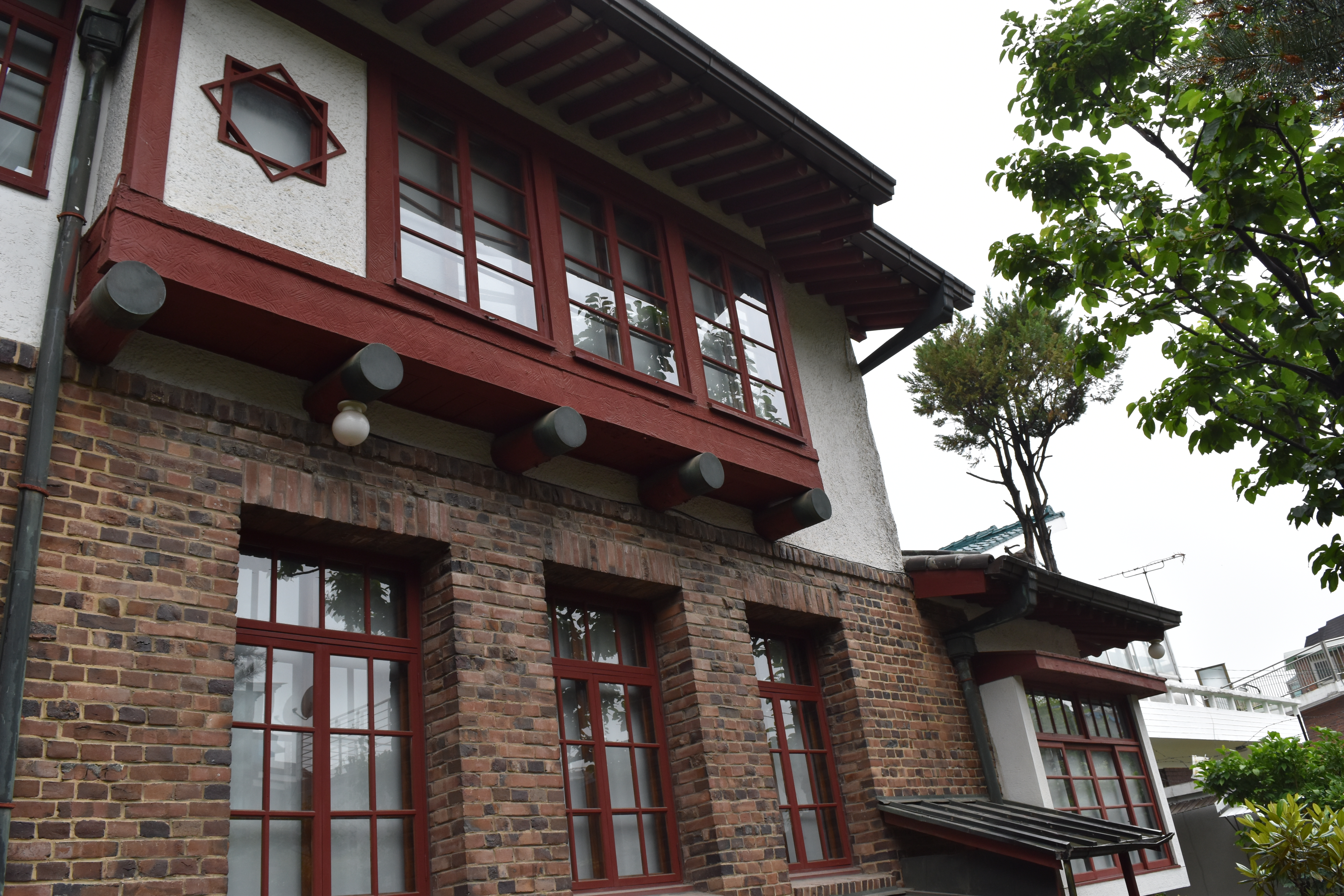
Park No-su house

A Western-style building with one basement floor and two above-ground floors at lot 168-2, Ogin-dong, completed after 1939 and originally owned by Yun Deok-yeong's son-in-law Kim Ho-hyeon (金鎬顯). It was designed by Pak Gil-ryong as a blend of hanok and French architectural styles. Park No-su purchased it from 1973 and lived there, and the Park No-su Art Museum opened in 2013. In the 1940s, a road connecting to the Yang-gwan ran behind the building.

=== Landscape ===
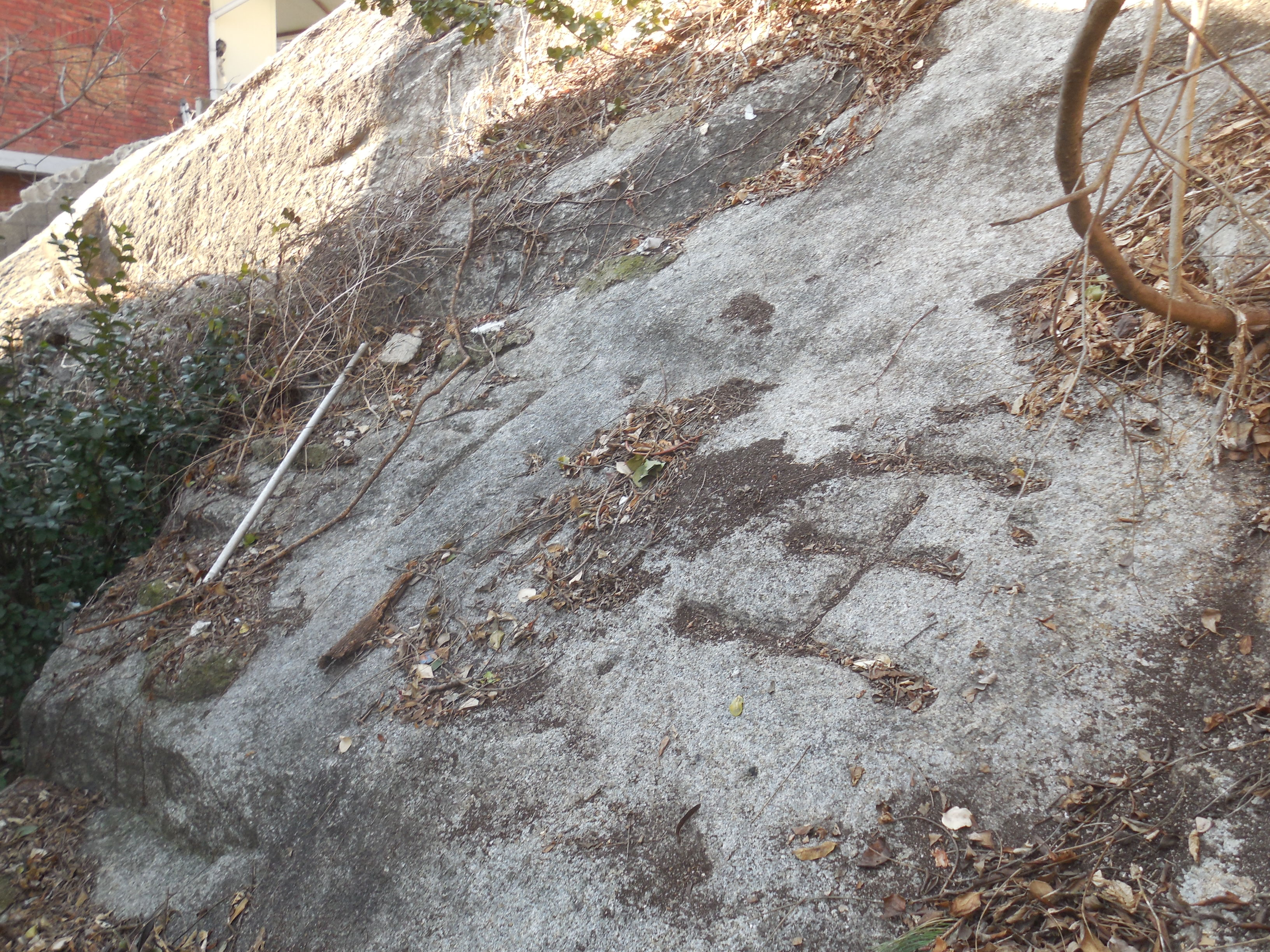
Rock carving of 'Ongnyudong' (玉流洞)

The forests around the buildings of Byeoksusanjang consisted of natural growth including pine trees, and there is a record that bamboo was planted during the period when the Yeoheung Min clan managed Songseogwon. When Yun Deok-yeong developed Byeoksusanjang, he planted a variety of trees; as of 1940, these reportedly included pines, cherry trees, zelkova trees, forsythia, magnolias, persimmons, azaleas, rhododendrons, paulownia, apricots, peaches, goji berries, wisteria, maples, weeping willows, ginkgos, junipers, fir trees, eumnamu, aeengdu, crape myrtles, chestnuts, white pines, Japanese beeches, pears, boxwoods, oaks, spindle trees, flat-topped pines (盤松), dureup trees, and hibiscus. In particular, Yun Deok-yeong personally planted maple trees along the stream.

On the outskirts of Byeoksusanjang was a rectangular pond (方池) that collected water flowing down from Suyeongdong Valley (the main stream of Ongnyucheon). About 200 pyeong in area, it was reportedly used for boating. It was at what is now lots 1–3, Nusang-dong. Near Iryang-jeong was another 50-pyeong pond fed by the Ongnyudong Valley (a tributary of Ongnyucheon). Today it has been converted into a drain in a house yard and no trace remains. Three bridges crossed the two streams encircling Byeoksusanjang; of these, part of the railing stone of Ohonggyo—the bridge that led from the main gate into Byeoksusanjang—survives at Sejong Apartments, lot 56, Ogin-dong.

Among the rock carvings, there were four inscriptions: 'Ongnyudong (玉流洞)', 'Songseogwon (松石園)', 'Gwidae (龜臺)', and 'Byeoksusanjang (碧樹山莊)'. 'Gwidae' is said to have been written by Kim Su-geun on a turtle-shaped boulder in the middle of the pond, and 'Byeoksusanjang' is said to have been written by Yun Yong-gu in 1911. The 'Byeoksusanjang' inscription was carved vertically beside the 'Songseogwon' inscription. The 'Ongnyudong' inscription is traditionally attributed to Song Si-yeol's calligraphy; its whereabouts were unknown after the 1950s until it was rediscovered in 2019.

== Notes ==
Content notes

Reference notes
