= Retailing in South Korea =

Retailing in South Korea consists of hypermarkets, department stores, flea markets, traditional markets, and underground shopping malls. Hypermarkets sell dry goods and groceries, similar to Western supercentres. Traditional markets are also popular throughout South Korea.

== Hypermarkets ==
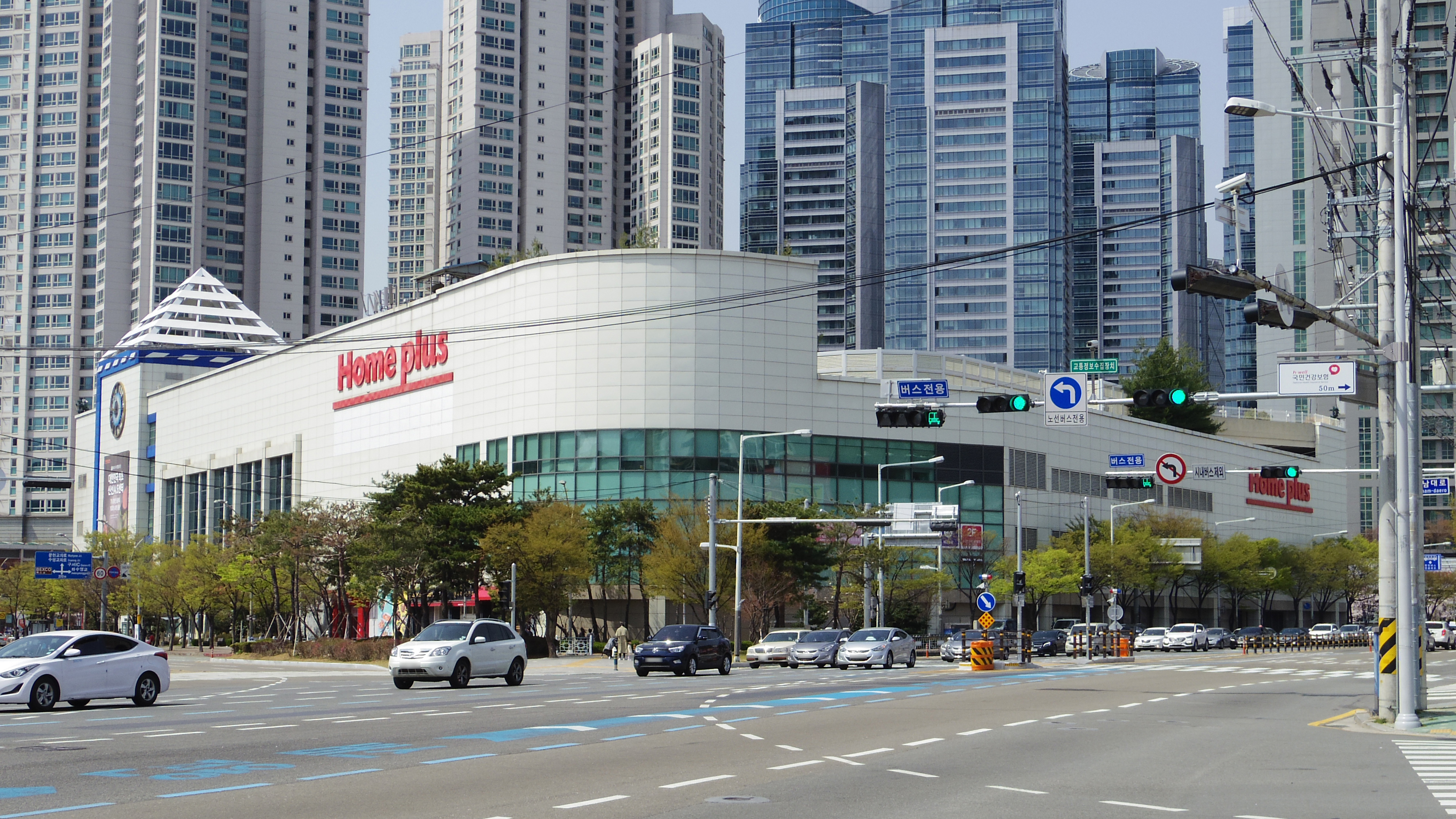
Homeplus, a hypermarket

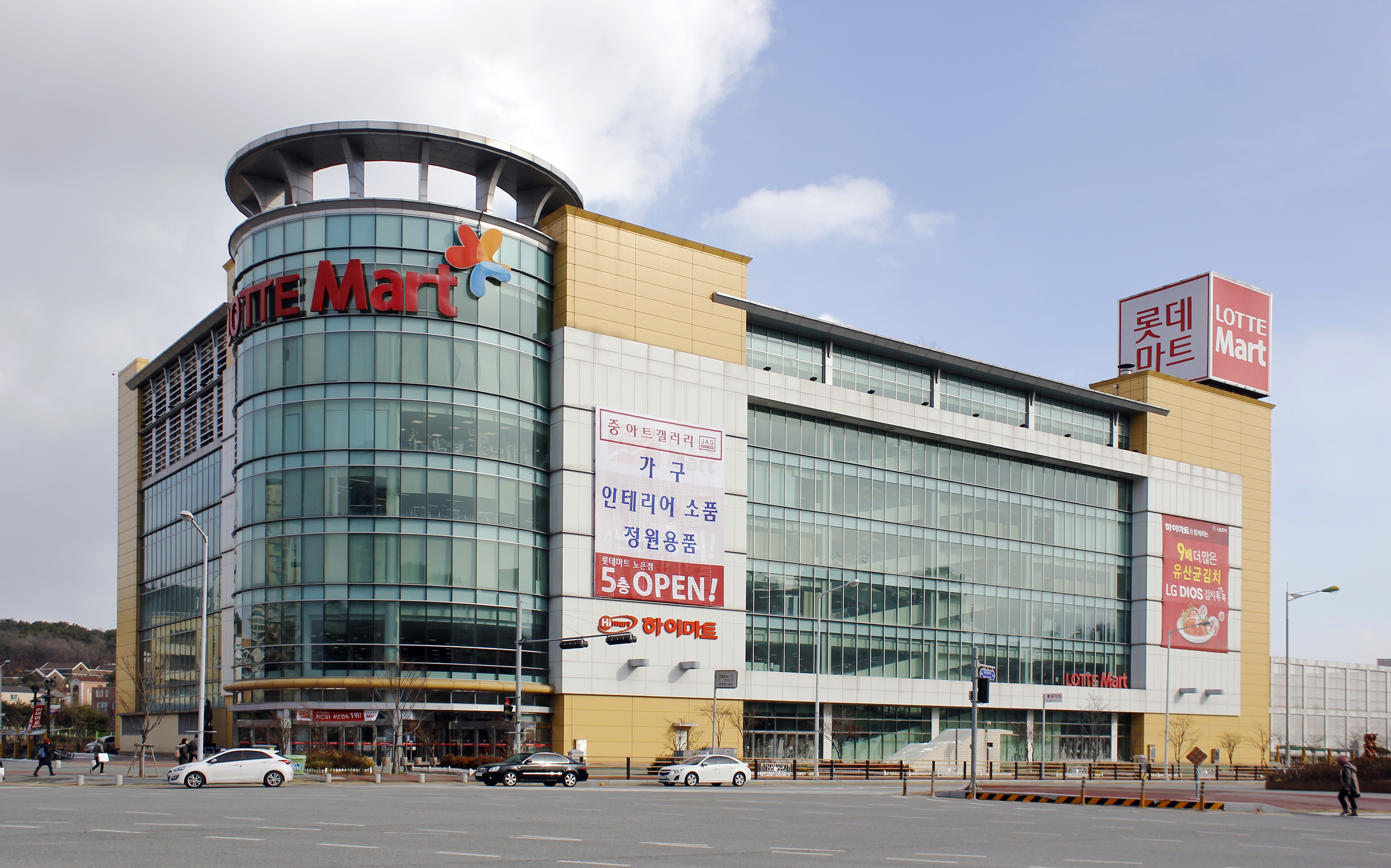
LotteMart

South Korea's's large stores usually cover over 3,000 square metres (32,000 sq ft) and sell self-service food, household goods and home appliances at a discount. Food products (fresh and processed foods) account for 50 percent of sales, followed by household goods and appliances. Hypermarkets include E-Mart, Homeplus and Lotte Mart, as well as warehouse stores such as Costco, Traders and Big Market.

=== History of hypermarkets ===
Hypermarkets were introduced to South Korea in 1993. Shinsegae opened its first E-mart store in Changdong-gu. The first hypermarket was a warehouse with minimal service and an uncluttered interior. During the late 1990s, hypermarkets included more luxurious interior, better service and facilities designed to match Korean buying habits. In 1996, Korean companies and foreign global retailers such as Wal-Mart and Carrefour began to compete; Wal-Mart and Carrefour withdrew from the South Korean market in 2006 and 2007. When Homeplus acquired 35 Homever stores from E.Land Retail in 2008, three retailers—E-mart (1993), Lotte Mart (1998) and Homeplus (1999)—took over the market.

=== Sales ===
Hypermarket sales were about $3.4 billion as of 2013, at 483 stores nationwide. Korea's 2013 retail market was $310 billion, with hypermarkets accounting for about 10.8 percent of the total. This is the highest percentage of major retail outlets such as department stores, supermarkets and convenience stores.

South Korea's three largest hypermarkets (E-mart, Lotte Mart and Homeplus) had 395 stores in 2013; E-Mart had 148 stores (37.5 percent), Homeplus had 139 (35.2 percent), and Lotte Mart had 108 (27.3 percent). E-Mart and Lotte Mart's outlets included warehouse stores.

== Department stores ==
A department store carries a variety of products in a number of price ranges. They generally offer more customer service, and are located in cities and rural areas.

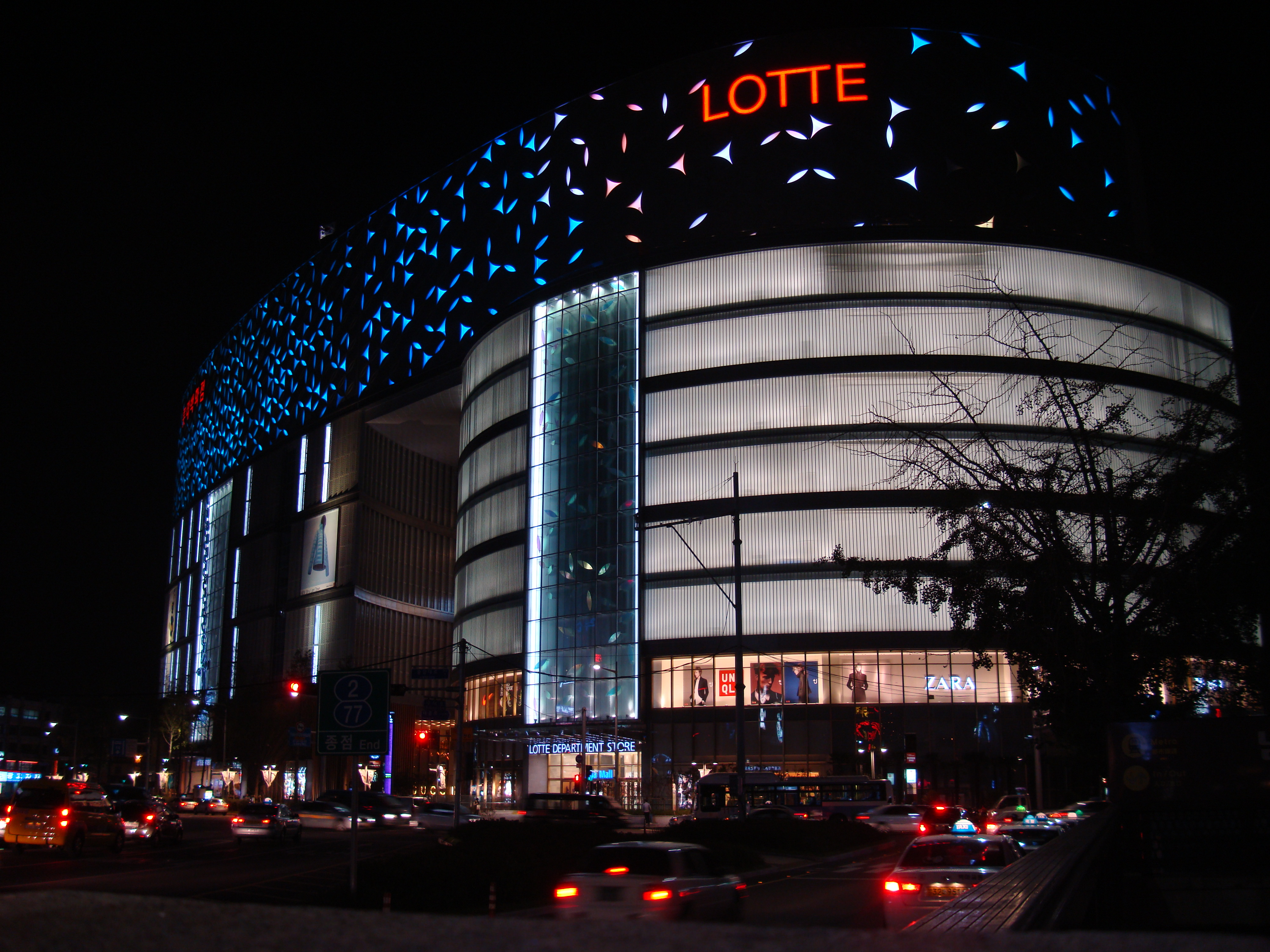
A Lotte department store in Jung District, Busan

In South Korea, department stores are defined by the Distribution Industry Development Act as retail stores with more than 3,000 square meters of floor space, diverse inventory and customer-friendly facilities. Under the law, the stores are registered and managed by local governments as large stores. Large stores include department stores, large marts, shopping centers, shopping malls, specialty stores, and other large retail stores. Most are registered as department stores; some are shopping centers or shopping malls, and some outlet and shopping-mall buildings have been registered as department stores. Lotte, Hyundai and Shinsegae are the largest nationwide department store chains, in terms of market share.

=== History of department stores ===
Department stores in Korea were opened in Seoul, Busan and Pyongyang around 1930, primarily with Japanese capital when the country was under Japanese rule. The first was the Hwasin Department Store, founded by Park Heung-sik in 1931. During the 1980s, the store went out of business. In 1963, Samsung Group acquired the Donghwa Department Store (located at Shinsegae headquarters) and changed its name to Shinsegae. In 1966, Midopa Department Store was established. It was based on Jeongjaok, which was founded by national capital in 1938. During the 1970s, department stores became more popular as living standards improved. The stores, which had been concentrated in Seoul's Myeong-dong shopping district, have begun to spread throughout cities and near luxury housing. Lotte Department Store was established in 1979, followed by Hyundai, New York, Yeongdong, and Grand. During the 2000s, department stores also became leisure and cultural centers.

=== Galleria Department Store ===
The Galleria Department Store, operated by the Hanwha Group, is headquartered in Seoul's 63 Building. The chain operated five stores in 2015. Its main branch is located in Apgujeong-dong, Gangnam-gu, Seoul, and includes the café chain Beans and Berries.

=== Hyundai Department Store ===
The Hyundai Department Store chain (Hangul: 주식회사 현대백화점, 株式會社 現代百貨店) was established by the Hyundai Group in 1968. Its main branch is at 165 Apgujeong-dong, Gangnam-gu, Seoul, and the chain has several other stores nationwide. Hyundai is pursuing diversification from its department-store business. In 1985 it moved its head office to Apgujeong-dong, and changed its name to Hyundai Department Store in April 2000 at the Geumgang Development Industry.

=== Lotte Department Store ===
Lotte Department Store (Hangul: 롯데백화점) was established in 1979 and is headquartered in Sogong-dong, Jung-gu, Seoul. Offering consumer goods and services, it is one of eight business units of Lotte Shopping. Other Lotte retail companies include the discount store Lotte Mart and the supermarket Lotte Super.

=== Shinsegae Department Store ===
Interior of the Shinsegae Department Store in Busan

Shinsegae is a department-store company headquartered in Seoul. Shinsegae means "new world" in Korean. Its flagship store in Centum City, Busan, is the world's largest department store, surpassing Macy's flagship Herald Square store in 2009.

Shinsegae is the only South Korean department store which uses its original headquarters building. Opened on October 24, 1930, it was renamed Donghwa Department Store after the liberation of Korea and became part of the Samsung Group in 1963. Shinsegae changed its trademark to a peacock in 1970; it declared its independence from the Samsung Group in 1991, and the split was completed in 1997. In 2001, the company changed its name from Shinsegae Department Store to Shinsegae.

== Flea markets ==
Flea markets in Seoul sell secondhand goods and handcrafts. Some markets are open year-round; others are open once a week or twice a month.

=== Hwanghak-dong Flea Market ===
The Hwanghak-dong Flea Market (Hangul: 황학동 벼룩시장), along the Cheonggyecheon, sells secondhand goods. It is also known as Manmul Market (Hangul: 만물시장) and Dokkaebi Market (Hangul: 도깨비시장).

=== Seoul Folk Flea Market ===
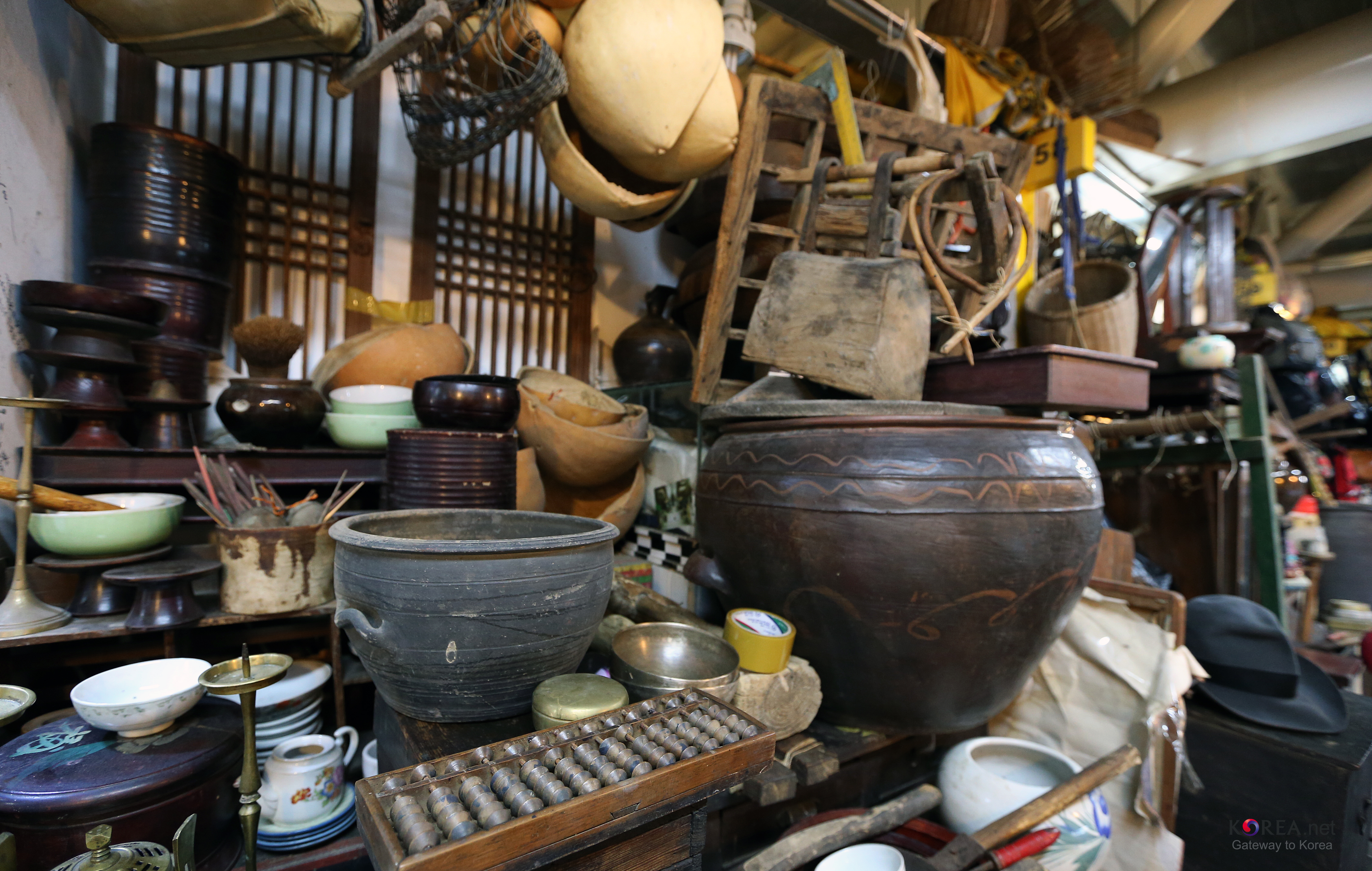
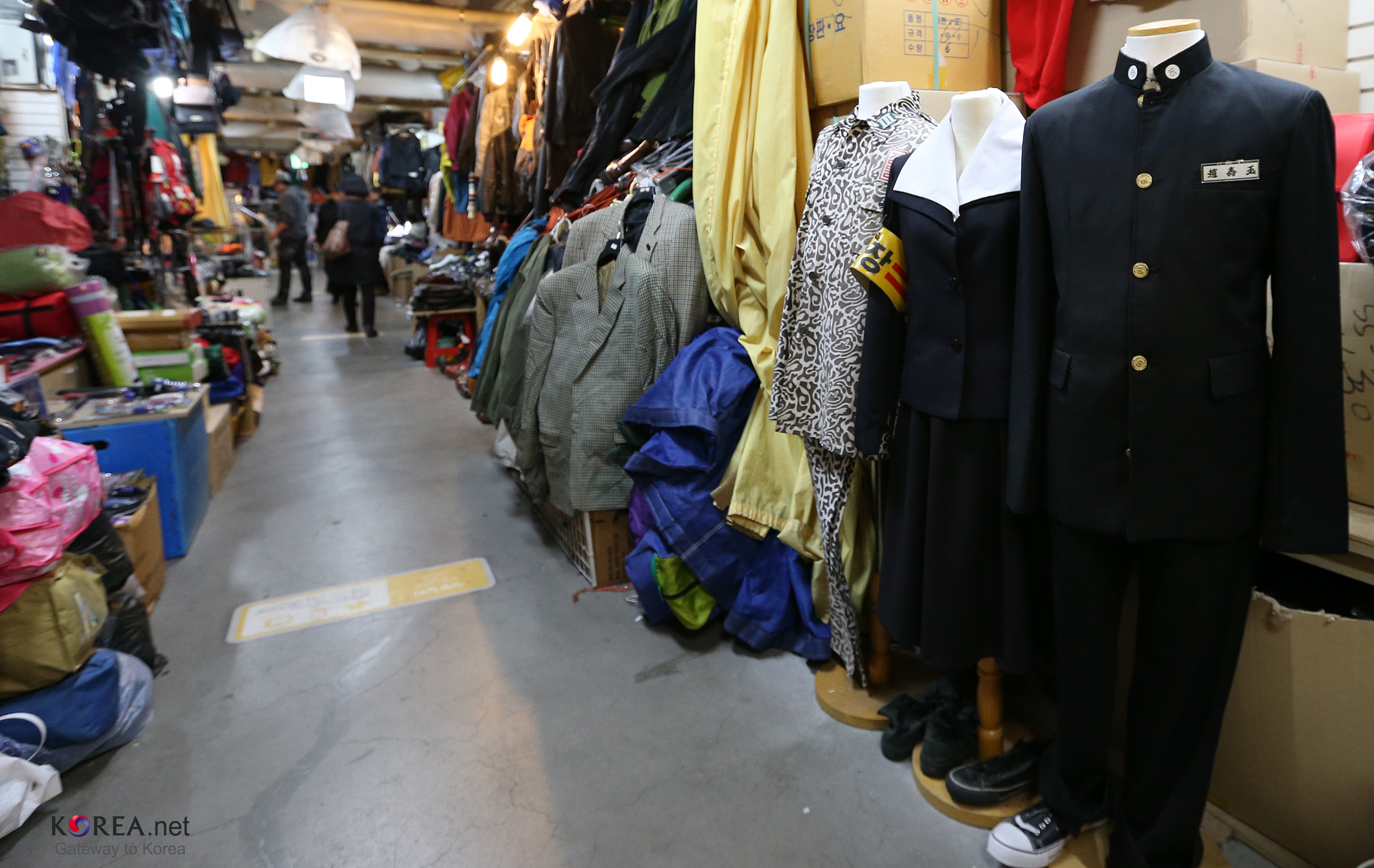
Seoul Folk Flea Market

The Seoul Folk Flea Market (Hangul: 서울 풍물시장) sells specialty products from a number of South Korean regions. It was established by vendors of the Hwanghak-dong Flea Market, who lost their space because of the Cheonggyecheon restoration. Available items include traditional Korean snacks.

=== Insa-dong flea markets ===
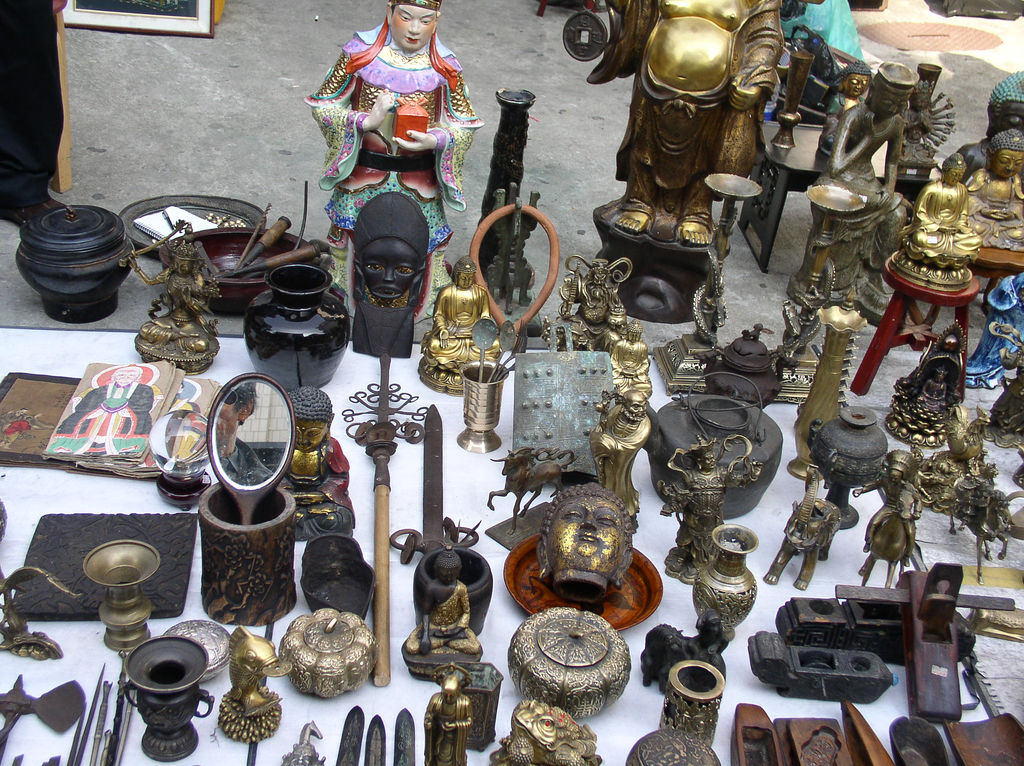
Insa-dong flea market

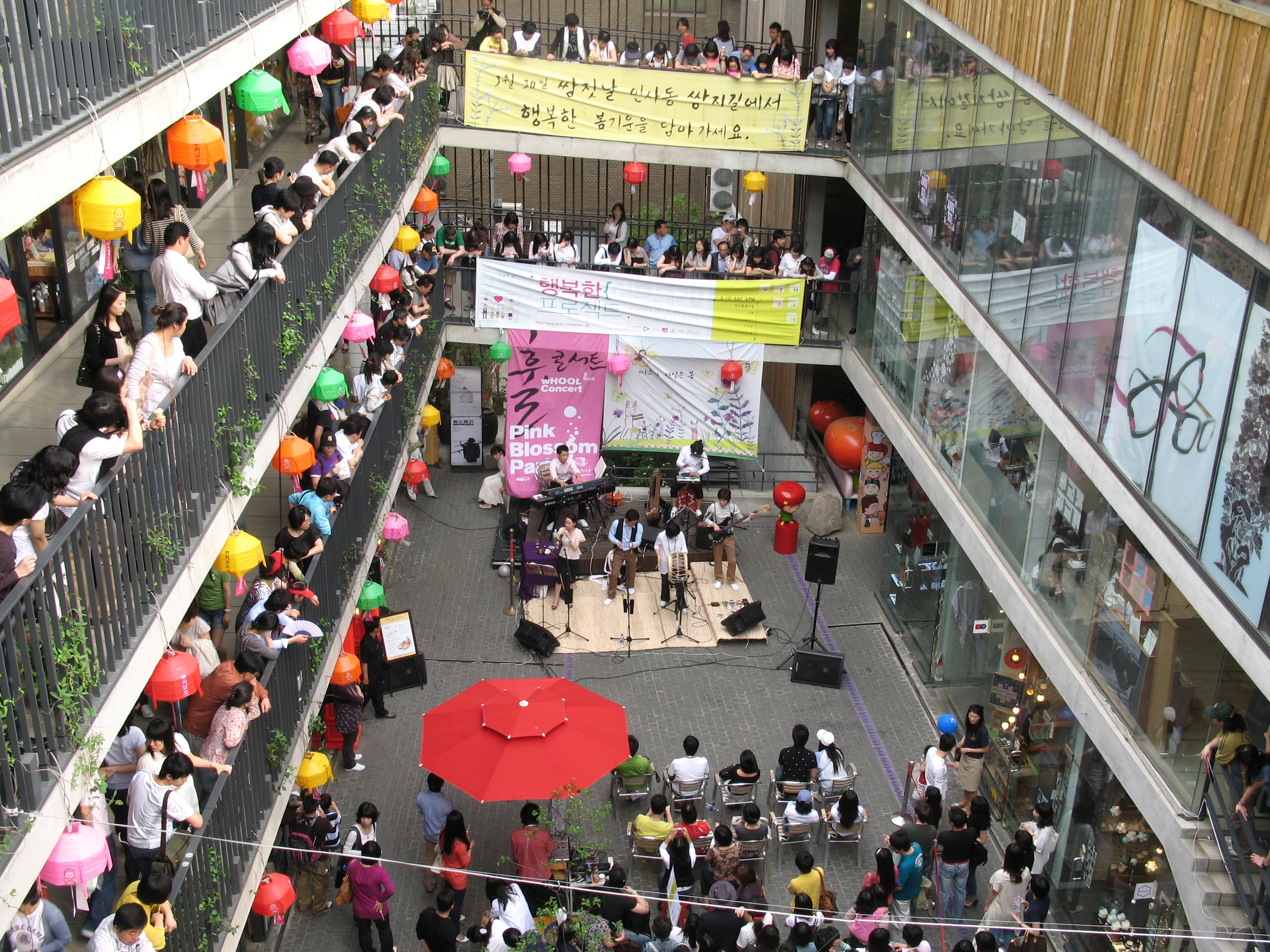
Music at Ssamzie Market

Ssamzigil (Hangul: 쌈지길) is an Insa-dong shopping street which sells handcrafts and designer goods. It has four above-ground levels, connected by a walkway. In addition to selling antiques and handcrafts, the street has exhibitions, performances, and traditional tea houses.

=== Hongdae Free Market ===
The Hongdae Free Market (Hangul: 홍대 프리마켓) is on the streets surrounding Hongik University, popularly known as Hongdae. The market, which enables artists to interact with the public, attracts 50 to 60 teams of artists who perform, sell, and exhibit their work every Saturday. Among its wares are metal crafts, leather works, ceramic and wood crafts, and glass works.

=== Seocho Saturday Flea Market ===
The Seocho Saturday Flea Market (Hangul: 서초 토요 벼룩시장) was originally a place for selling secondhand household items to deal with the 1997 Asian financial crisis. Among its wares are seasonal items and nursery products.

== Traditional markets ==
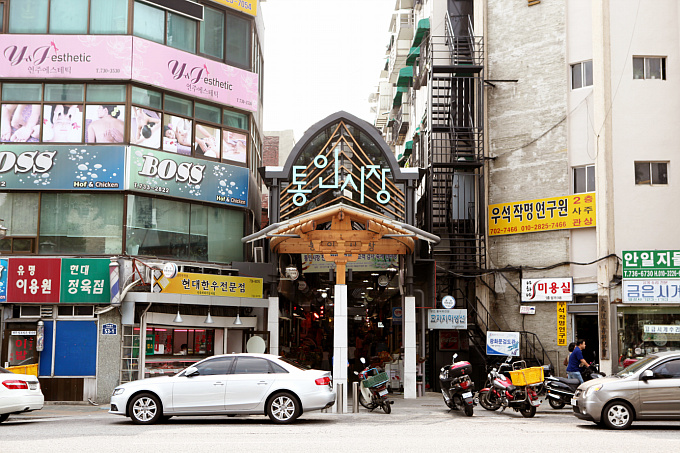
Tongin Market entrance

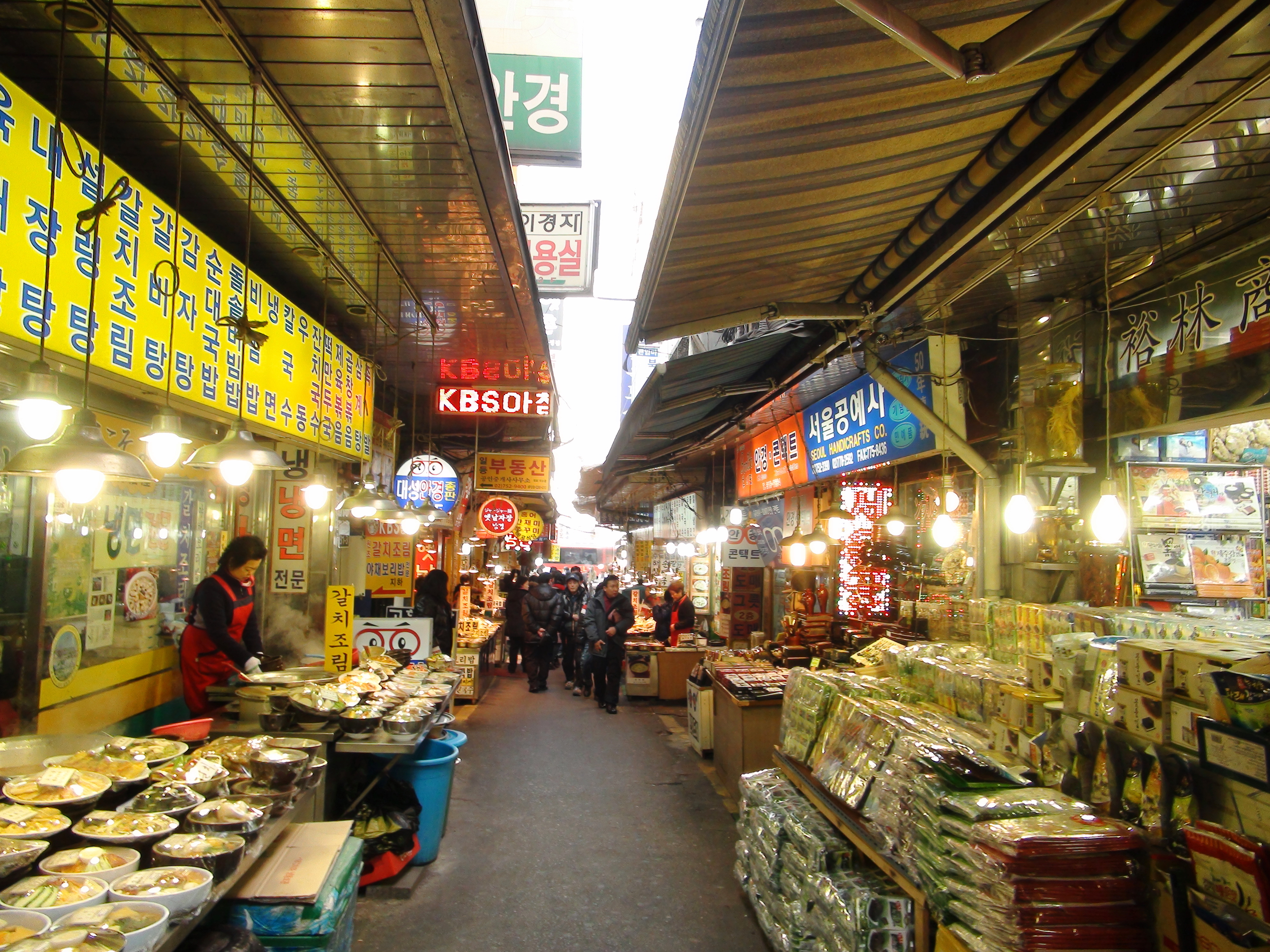
Namdaemun Market

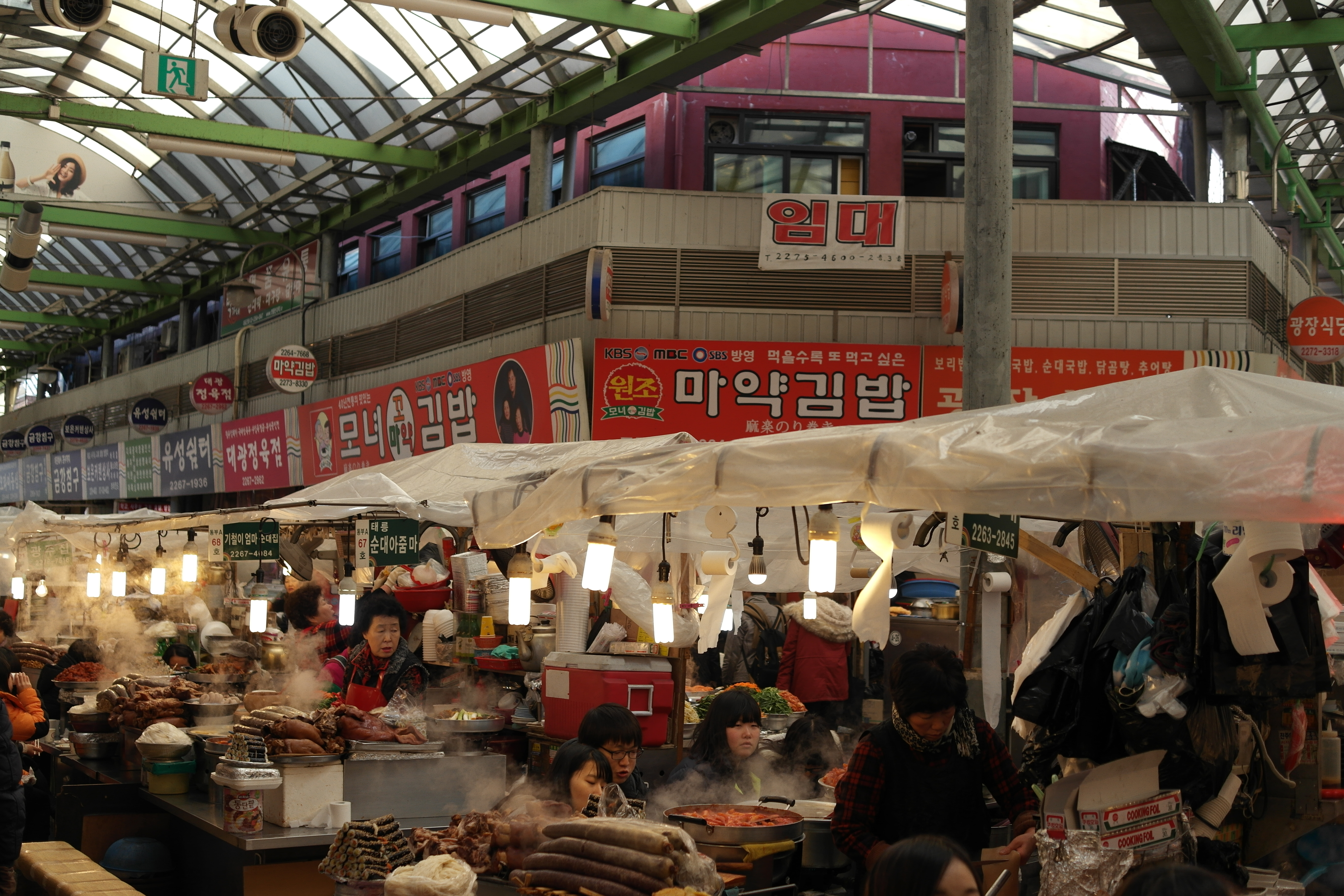
Gwangjang Market

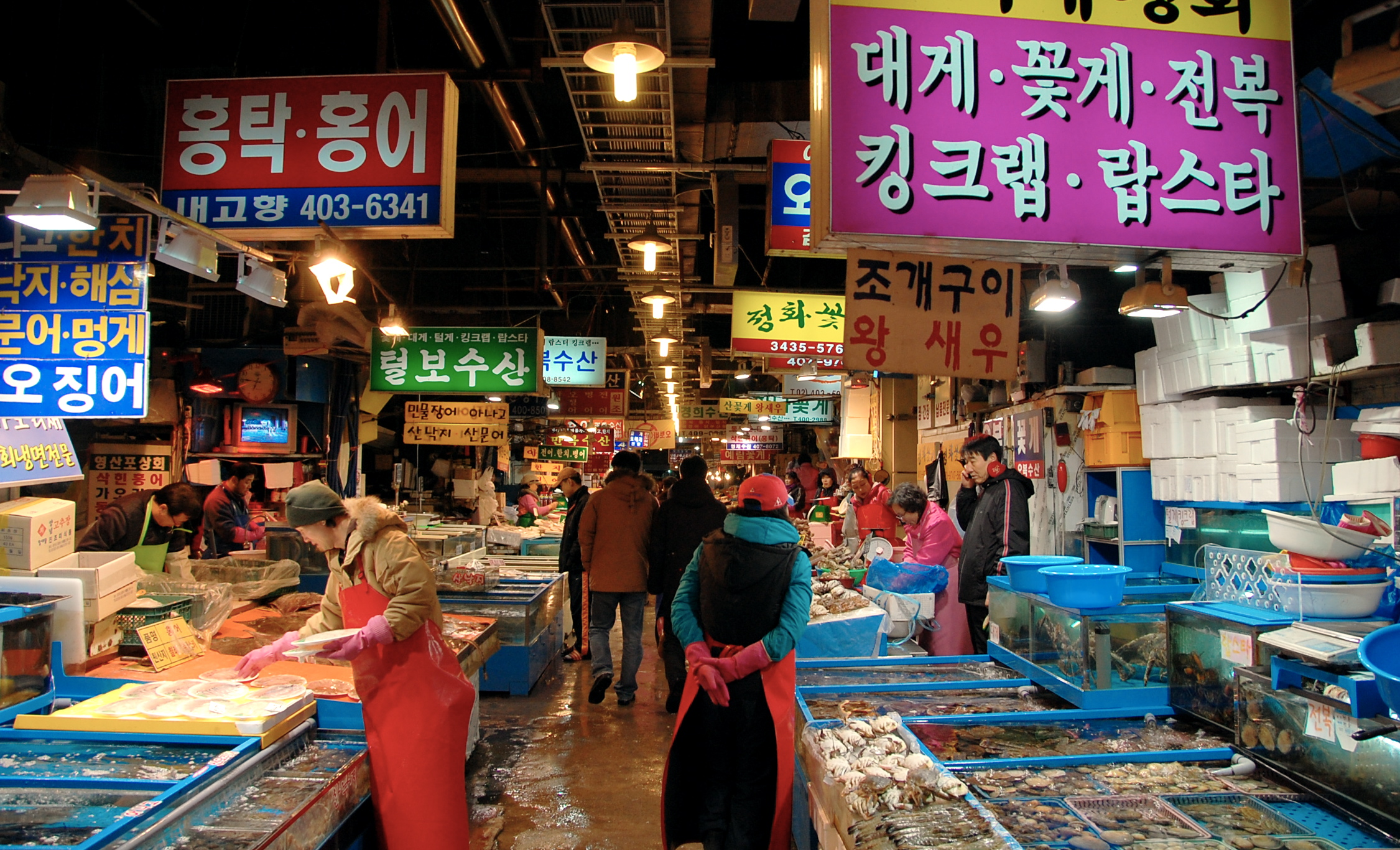
Garak Market

=== In Seoul ===
==== Tongin Market ====
Tongin Market was founded in June 1941 for the Japanese who lived near Hyoja-dong (Hangul: 효자동) during the Japanese colonial period. After the Korean War, the demand for space due to the sudden population increase in the Seochon neighborhood (Hangul: 서촌) led to the expansion of the market and the surrounding shops. Tongin Market, which consists of 75 stores, has many restaurants and sells vegetables, fruit, fish and shoes. The market was modernized in 2005. In 2010, it was designated a "Seoul-based cultural market" in Jongno District where culture and art meet. The market has been registered as a corporation in Tongin Community Village, and established an integrated call center and a distribution center.

==== Namdaemun Market ====
The Namdaemun Market dates back to the 15th century. In 1964, it became a joint-stock company of landowners and merchants. It offers over 1,700 varieties of goods, including clothing, accessories, kitchenware, and traditional handicrafts. The Deoksugung Palace and Gwanghwamun Gate are nearby.

==== Gwangjang Market ====
The Gwangjang Market, in Seoul's Jongno District, is one of South Korea's oldest markets. In 1905, Japan took control of the market after the signing of the Japan–Korea Treaty of 1905 after the Russo-Japanese War. Its original name was Dongdaemun Market, and it received its present name in 1960. The name was derived from the area by the market, between the extended Gwanggyo bridge and the long Janggyo bridge. The market has vendors who serve popular Korean foods such as bindae-tteok, gimbap, bibimbap, and sundae.

==== Garak Market ====
Garak Market, which opened in 1985, is South Korea's first public wholesale market. The market is divided into sections which sell fruit, vegetables, seafood, and meat.

==== Noryangjin Fisheries Wholesale Market ====
The Noryangjin Fisheries Wholesale Market, Seoul's central wholesale fish market, has consignment sales, rents facilities, operates cold storage, and makes and sells ice. The market is over 80 years old.

=== Outside Seoul ===
Name	Location	Products	Image
Jeju Dongmun Traditional Market (Hangul: 동문재래시장)	Jeju Island	Agricultural products, seafood	
Busan Gukje Market (Hangul: 남포동 국제시장)	Busan	Machinery, electronics, kitchen appliances, clothing, food, agricultural products, fish, dairy products, industrial products	Grocery market
Busan Bupyeong (Kkangtong) Market (Hangul: 부평시장(깡통시장))	Busan	Liquor, clothing, accessories, general merchandise	
Chuncheon Market (Hangul: 춘천 낭만시장)	Chuncheon	Clothing, shoes, produce, seafood	
Jeonju Nambu Traditional Market (Hangul: 전주 남부시장)	Jeonju	General merchandise, vegetables, fruit, fish, meat	
Gyeongju Jungang Market (Hangul: 경주 중앙시장)	Gyeongju	Clothing, linen, cotton, general merchandise, food, fish, meat, rice cakes, dining	
Incheon Sinpo International Market (Hangul: 신포국제시장)	Incheon	Produce, meat, fish, bread, rice cakes, clothing, shoes, general merchandise, dining	
Suwon Paldalmun Market (Hangul: 수원 영동시장)	Suwon	General merchandise, clothing, housewares, groceries, poultry	
Daegu Seomun Market (Hangul: 대구 서문시장)	Daegu	Silk, cotton, linen, crafts, kitchenware, men's and women's clothing, seafood	Market entrance
Gangneung Jungang Market (Hangul: 강릉 중앙시장)	Gangneung	Fresh and dried fish, clothing, hanbok, general merchandise	
Tongyeong Seoho and Jungang Markets (Hangul: 통영 중앙시장)	Tongyeong	Fresh and dried fish, agricultural and specialty products	

== Underground shopping malls ==
Some underground shopping malls have been renovated for increased convenience. Underground shopping malls sell a variety of clothing at lower prices than department and other stores.

=== Gangnam Station Underground Shopping Center ===
Gangnam Station Underground Shopping Center (Hangul: 강남역 지하도상가), in the Gangnam station of Seoul Subway Line 2, attracts students and young people on a budget. Connected to Line 9's Sinnonhyeon station, the Gangnam station Kyobo Book Centre is second to the Gwanghwamun branch in size. The bookstore (Hangul: 교보) has two floors: one for books and lectures, and the other to children's literature and art supplies.

=== Goto Mall (Gangnam Terminal Underground Shopping Center) ===
Gangnam Terminal Underground Shopping Center (Hangul: 강남터미널 지하도상가) is also known as the Goto Mall (Hangul: 고투몰). Over 600 stores are on both sides of two long, parallel corridors, with clothing, fashion accessories, interior products, flowers and dining. The entryways are open 24 hours a day, however most stores operate between 6:15 AM and 9:30 PM. The mall is connected to Famille station, the Gangnam Shinsegae department store, the Raemian Apartment's larger retail area, and Banpo Station.

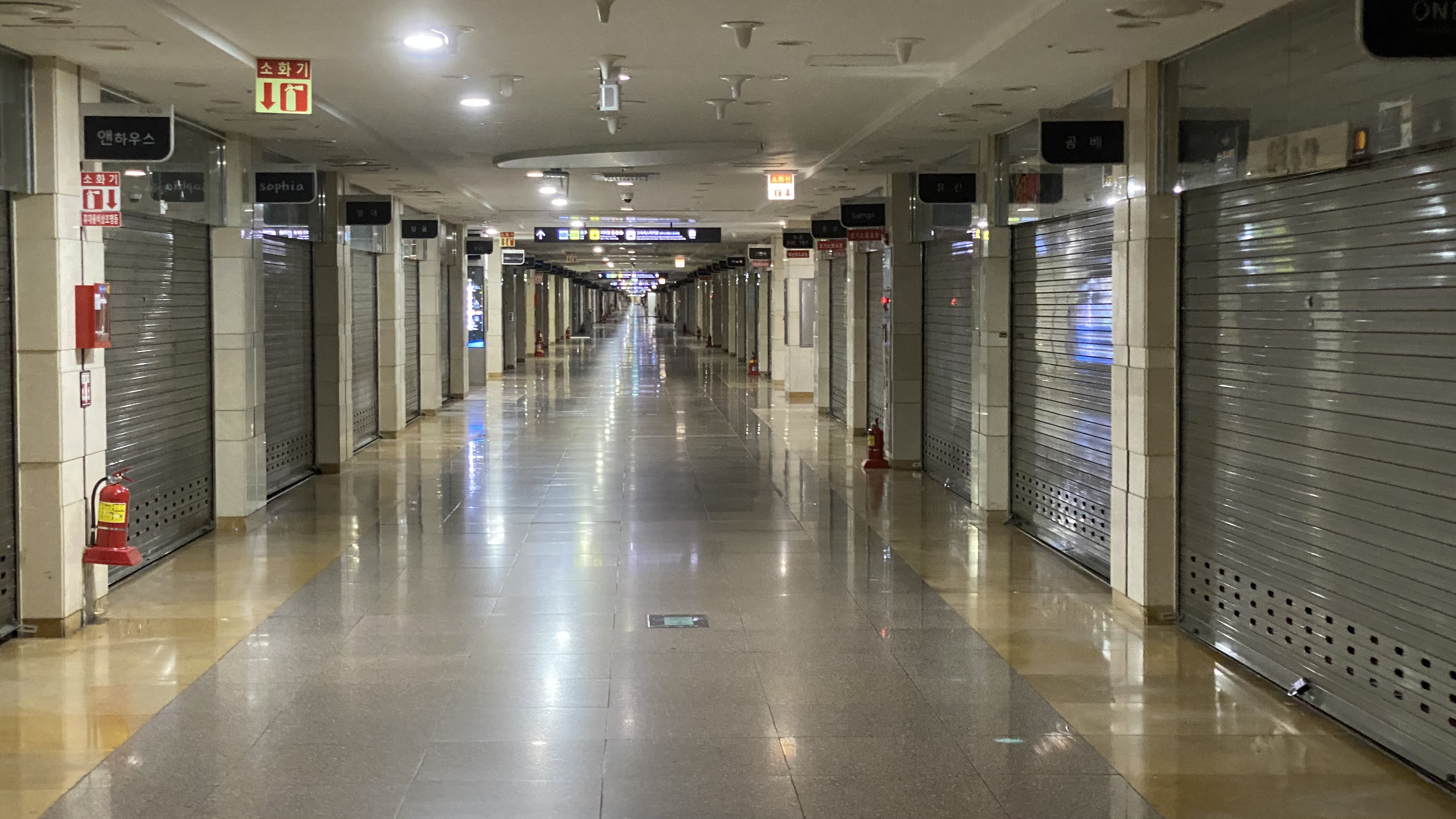
A Corridor of the Gotomall Underground Shopping Mall just past Midnight. All stores are closed.

=== Bupyeong Modoo Mall ===
Bupyeong Modoo Mall (Bupyeong Underground Shopping Mall) (Hangul: 부평 모두몰(부평 지하도상가)) has a variety of merchandise offered by about 1,400 businesses in an area covering approximately 31,000 square metres (330,000 sq ft). The mall is divided into seven sections, lettered A to G; a color-coded floor aids navigation. From the center of the mall, paths are red, green, or blue trails; the area around a fountain is orange.

=== Seomyeon Underground Shopping Center ===
The Seomyeon Underground Shopping Center (Hangul: 서면지하도상가) is in the Seomyeon station, the busiest area in Busan and a public-transport hub. The shopping center has a number of clothing, accessory, and shoe stops, and is connected to the Daehyeon Free Mall Busan branch and the Lotte Underground Mall. The shopping area also continues to ground level, and an information desk at the center of the underground mall offers interpretation services in English, Chinese, and Japanese.

=== Daehyeon Free Mall ===
The Daehyeon Free Mall is on Dongseong-ro, considered the heart of Daegu. The mall, featuring fashion, electronics and food, is accessible via subway from Jungangno station (Daegu Subway Line 1) and city buses. Events are held in the mall's cultural space.

== See also ==
- Shopping in Seoul
