= Changseong-dong =

Coordinates: 37.581°N 126.972°E

- Interactive map of Changseong-dong
- Country: South Korea

Area
  - Total: 0.06 km^{2} (0.023 sq mi)

Korean name
- Hangul: 창성동
- Hanja: 昌成洞
- RR: Changseong-dong
- MR: Ch'angsŏng-dong

Changseong-dong (Korean: 창성동) is a dong (neighborhood) of Jongno District, Seoul, South Korea. It is a legal dong (법정동 法定洞) administered under its administrative dong (행정동 行政洞), Hyoja-dong.

== See also ==
- Administrative divisions of South Korea
