= Ogin-dong =

- Interactive map of Ogin-dong
- Country: South Korea

Area
  - Total: 0.42 km^{2} (0.16 sq mi)

Korean name
- Hangul: 옥인동
- Hanja: 玉仁洞
- RR: Ogin-dong
- MR: Ogin-dong

Ogin-dong (Korean: 옥인동) is a dong (neighbourhood) of Jongno District, Seoul, South Korea. It is a legal dong (법정동; 法定洞), administered under its administrative dong (행정동; 行政洞), Hyoja-dong, of which it covers the westernmost part, until the fortress wall of Inwangsan.

Ogin-dong belongs to Seochon, Seoul's "Western village" lying between Inwangsan and Gyeongbokgung, where traditional Korean houses known as hanok congregate with modern shops, cafes and galleries.

Within its boundaries is Songseogwon (수성동계곡; 水聲洞溪谷), located at the foot of Inwangsan, famous for its natural beauty since the Joseon era. It is now developed as a natural tourist attraction.

== See also ==
- Administrative divisions of South Korea
