= Seochon =

Neighborhood in Seoul, South Korea

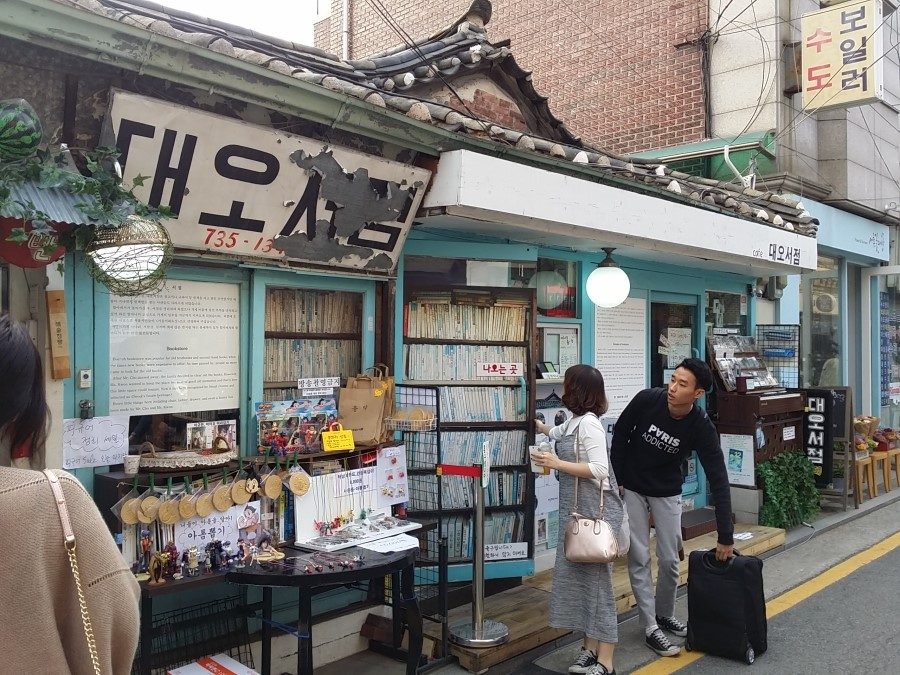
- Seochon Dae-o bookstore

Korean name
- Hangul: 서촌
- Hanja: 西村
- RR: Seochon
- MR: Sŏch'on

Seochon (Korean: 서촌) is one of the oldest neighborhoods of Jongno District, Seoul, South Korea. It translates as "West village" or "Western village" as it is west of the palace Gyeongbokgung. It is also thought that the name could have derived from Mt Inwangsan as the mountain used to be called "Seosan" or "old mountain in the west." Seochon is traditionally associated with the Joseon dynasty and Korean literature.

== Boundaries ==
Seochon is located west of the palace Gyeongbokgung, at the base of Inwangsan. The Fortress Wall of Seoul Wall and the Sajik and Jahamun subway tunnels are the boundaries of the neighborhood. The neighborhood is composed of fifteen smaller neighborhoods called "dong." Seochon is located at 36° 39' 25.794'' N 127° 24' 4.3848'' E with an average elevation of 33.141 m / 108.732 feet.

== Culture and traditions ==
Korean literature is filled with references to Seochon neighborhoods. While few original landmarks remain intact, the neighborhood contains many historical signs and is the birthplace of King Sejong. Traditionally, the area is of great significance to shamanists and geomancy, partially due to its proximity to the Inwangsan mountain. The neighborhood also contains the Seoul Sajikdan and Jongmyo shrines, along with the Gyeongbok palace. Protected historical landmarks in the neighborhood also include a cluster of over 600 hanok, the Yi Sang and Yi Sangbeom Houses, and the Pak No-soo House in Ogin-dong, which was recently restored and opened as the Pak No-soo Art Museum.

== Tongin Market ==
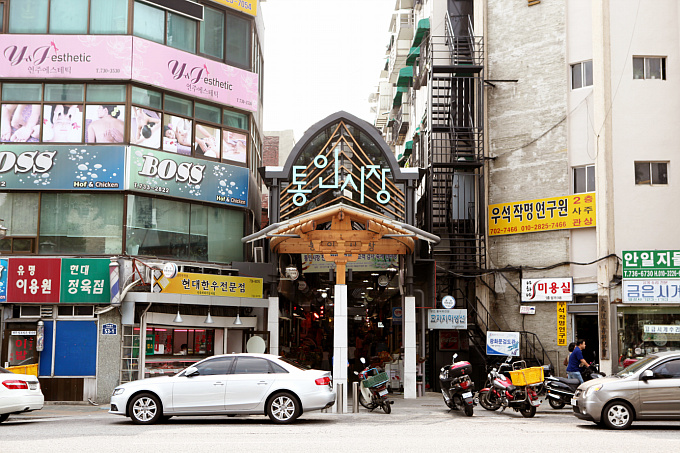
Main entrance of Tongin Market

Located in Hyoja-dong, the Tongin Market dates back to 1941 when Korea was still under Japanese rule. After the Korean War, the market grew, and stalls in the market grew in demand. The market now contains over 70 stores, including several restaurants and a grocery store for tourists.

== Landmarks ==
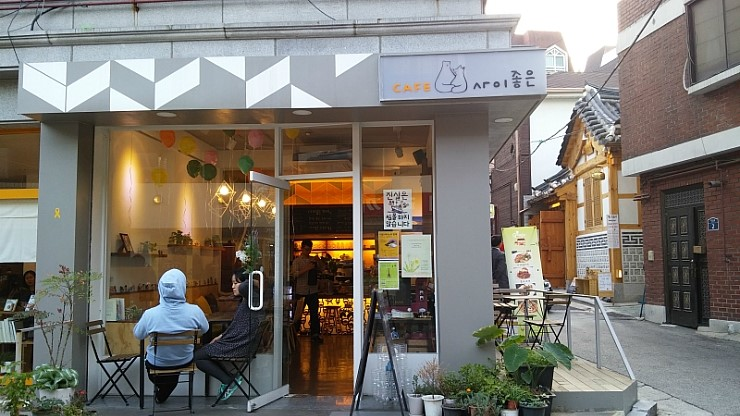
one of many Seochon cafes

=== Sajik Park ===
Sajik Park was designed in the Choseon Dynasty era and opened to the public in 1922. It was built for worshiping the Earth and harvest gods and is one of the oldest parks in Seoul.

=== Tongui-dong ===
Tongui-dong is a neighbourhood in Seochon. During the Joseon Dynasty, High court officials walked through this place to go to work, and merchants and craftsmen set up shops there. It was also the home of several famous historical figures, including the painters Yi Jung-seop and Yi Sang-beom and the poets Yun Dongju and Yi Sang.

=== Daelim Contemporary Art Museum ===
The Daelim Contemporary Art Museum is located in the residential area of Tongui-dong, and is near the Gyeongbokgung Palace. The Daelim Museum began as a photography museum, eventually widening its scope to include design and a wide range of other art fields.

=== The National Palace Museum of Korea ===
The National Palace Museum of Korea has a large collection of art and objects from the palaces of the Joseon period. The Museum attempts to raise the public's knowledge of the artistic and cultural legacy of the Joseon Dynasty through its various exhibitions and educational programs.

=== Suseongdong Valley ===
Located in Ogin-dong, at the foot of Inwangsan, Suseongdong Valley is famed for its natural beauty since the Joseon era, serving as a recreational hotspot for royalty and commoners, poets and painters alike. It derives its name from the gushing of the stream that flows from Inwangsan to the river Cheonggyecheon. Jeong Seon, the famed painter known for his realistic scenery, visited the place and created a painting of the same name, which would be included in his collection 'Eight Scenic Views of Jangdong' (장동팔경첩; 壯洞八景帖)'.
