= Nuha-dong =

- Seochon Village
- Interactive map of Nuha-dong
- Country: South Korea

Area
  - Total: 0.06 km^{2} (0.023 sq mi)

Korean name
- Hangul: 누하동
- Hanja: 樓下洞
- RR: Nuha-dong
- MR: Nuha-dong

Nuha-dong (Korean: 누하동) is a dong (neighbourhood) of Jongno District, Seoul, South Korea. It is a legal dong (법정동 法定洞) administered under its administrative dong (행정동 行政洞), Hyoja-dong.

== See also ==
- Administrative divisions of South Korea
