= Nusang-dong =

- Interactive map of Nusang-dong
- Country: South Korea

Area
  - Total: 0.26 km^{2} (0.10 sq mi)

Korean name
- Hangul: 누상동
- Hanja: 樓上洞
- RR: Nusang-dong
- MR: Nusang-dong

Nusang-dong (Korean: 누상동) is a dong (neighbourhood) of Jongno District, Seoul, South Korea. It is a legal dong (법정동 法定洞) administered under its administrative dong (행정동 行政洞), Hyoja-dong.

== See also ==
- Administrative divisions of South Korea
