= White Pine =

White Pine or White Pines may refer to:

== Trees ==
=== Trees in the pine subgenus Pinus subgenus Strobus ===
- Eastern white pine (Pinus strobus), one of these species, native to northeastern North America
- Western white pine (Pinus monticola), another of these species, native to northwestern North America
- Limber pine (Pinus flexilis), another of these species from western North America, was also sometimes known as White Pine
- Chinese white pine (Pinus armandii), a species native to China
- Japanese white pine (Pinus parviflora), a species native to Japan
- Vietnamese white pine (Pinus dalatensis), a species native to Vietnam and Laos
- Pinus albicaulis, of subsection Cembra (the stone pines), native to western North America

=== Other coniferous trees called White Pine ===
- Kahikatea (Dacrycarpus dacrydioides), a podocarp tree endemic to New Zealand

== Places ==
=== United States ===
- White Pines, California
- Whitepine, Colorado
- White Pine, Michigan
- White Pine, Tennessee
- White Pine County, Nevada
- White Pine Haven, Wisconsin
- White Pine Township, Aitkin County, Minnesota
- White Pine, West Virginia
- White Pine Creek, a stream in Idaho

== Other uses ==
- White Pine Music, a record label
