= Inwangsan =

Mountain in Seoul, South Korea

- Southern side of Inwangsan (2023)

Highest point
- Elevation: 338 m (1,109 ft)

Geography
- Location: South Korea

Climbing
- Easiest route: Gyeongbokgung Station

Korean name
- Hangul: 인왕산
- Hanja: 仁王山
- RR: Inwangsan
- MR: Inwangsan

Inwangsan (Korean: 인왕산) is a mountain in central Seoul, South Korea. It is in parts of Jongno District and Seodaemun District and has a height of 338 m (1,109 ft). The name literally means "compassionate/benevolent king" in Korean. The mountain covers an area of 1,086,696.50 m^{2} and has many huge granite peaks which distinguish it from other mountains in Seoul. Each rock is named after its characteristic form, such as Gichabawi (기차바위; lit. 'train rock'), Chimabawi (치마바위; lit. 'skirt rock'), Iseulbawi (이슬바위; lit. 'dew rock'), Mojabawi (모자바위; lit. 'hat rock'), and Jiryeongibawi (지렁이바위; lit. 'worm rock').

Inwangsan is famous for its view, so many painters depicted the mountain in their works such as Jeong Seon's Inwang jesaekdo. The Fortress Wall of Seoul surrounds the mountain in which the temple Inwangsa and shrine Guksadang are located as well. Access to certain parts of the mountain, including the peak are limited during certain days and times due to the location of a military installation spanning different parts of the mountain.

== History ==
During the reign of King Sukjong of Goryeo, there was a palace in Namgyeong (Seoul), the capital of the south, and it was recorded as Myeongak. Later in the Joseon period, the mountain was called "Baegaksan", as there was a shrine dedicated to the mountain god. Since then, it has been called Bugaksan because it is located in the north among the mountains surrounding Seoul. The mountain facing the south was called Namsan. The height of the mountain is 342 m (1,122 ft), and it is gently flat to the south, and has a triangular raised shape that looks better than the surrounding mountains. After the collapse of Goryeo and the establishment of Joseon Dynasty, King Taejo Lee Seong-gye established the palace as a royal palace, and it was honored as a royal palace. When the Joseon Dynasty was founded, a shrine to honor the mountain god was created at the Sanjeong Department. South Korea at the Gyeongbok Palace, below the mountain in 1394 (Taejo of four years), fortification and Gyeongmudae (景武臺), which later known as Cheong Wa Dae (靑瓦臺), have been used as presidential office since 1948, and is located below the mountain.

In 1939, the Japanese Government-General of Chōsen carved a message into the side of Chimabawi in Chinese characters: 東亞靑年團結. The message is dedicated to a Japanese pan-Asianist youth society. After the 1945 liberation of Korea, an attempt was made to scratch out the message, but part of it still remains in the rock.

In June 1950, after the outbreak of the Korean War, South Korean general Ahn Byeong-beom suicide in the mountain after he failed to escape from the front line in Seoul. He was later posthumously recognized brigadier general.

== Inwangsa ==
Inwangsa is a temple that can be found at the southern foot of Inwangsan mountain. The temple was established in the early Joseon dynasty to guard Gyeongbokgung palace to the east. There are 11 shrines from five Buddhist orders leading up to Seonbawi, an unusuaul rock formation that has been used for many shamanist rites and rituals. One of the shrines in Inwangsa is Guksadang, a famous shamanist shrine that is actively used for rituals to this day.

== Suseongdong ==
Located in at the foot of Inwangsan in Ogin-dong, is Songseogwon (수성동계곡; 水聲洞溪谷) that oversees the stream Okryudongcheon (옥류동천; 玉流洞川) flowing towards Cheonggyecheon. The valley got its name from the gushing of the stream. It is famed for its natural beauty since the Joseon era, with royalty and commoners, poets and painters alike visiting the area for recreation. For example, Jeong Seon, the famed painter known for his realistic scenery, visited Suseongdong and created a painting with the same name, which would be included in his collection 'Eight Scenic Views of Jangdong' (장동팔경첩; 壯洞八景帖); Grand Prince Anpyeong, the third son of King Sejong, had his house built here, named it Bihaedang (비해당; 匪懈堂), and wrote 48 poems about its surroundings. The valley is also central to Wihang literature (위항문학; 委巷文學), a literary movement that saw Korean literature expanding towards the middle class. After the Korean War, rapid urbanization led to the encroachment of apartments around the valley. Between 2008 and 2012, the Seoul Metropolitan Government demolished these apartments and restored the valley to its natural state. It is now developed as a natural tourist attraction.

== Gallery ==
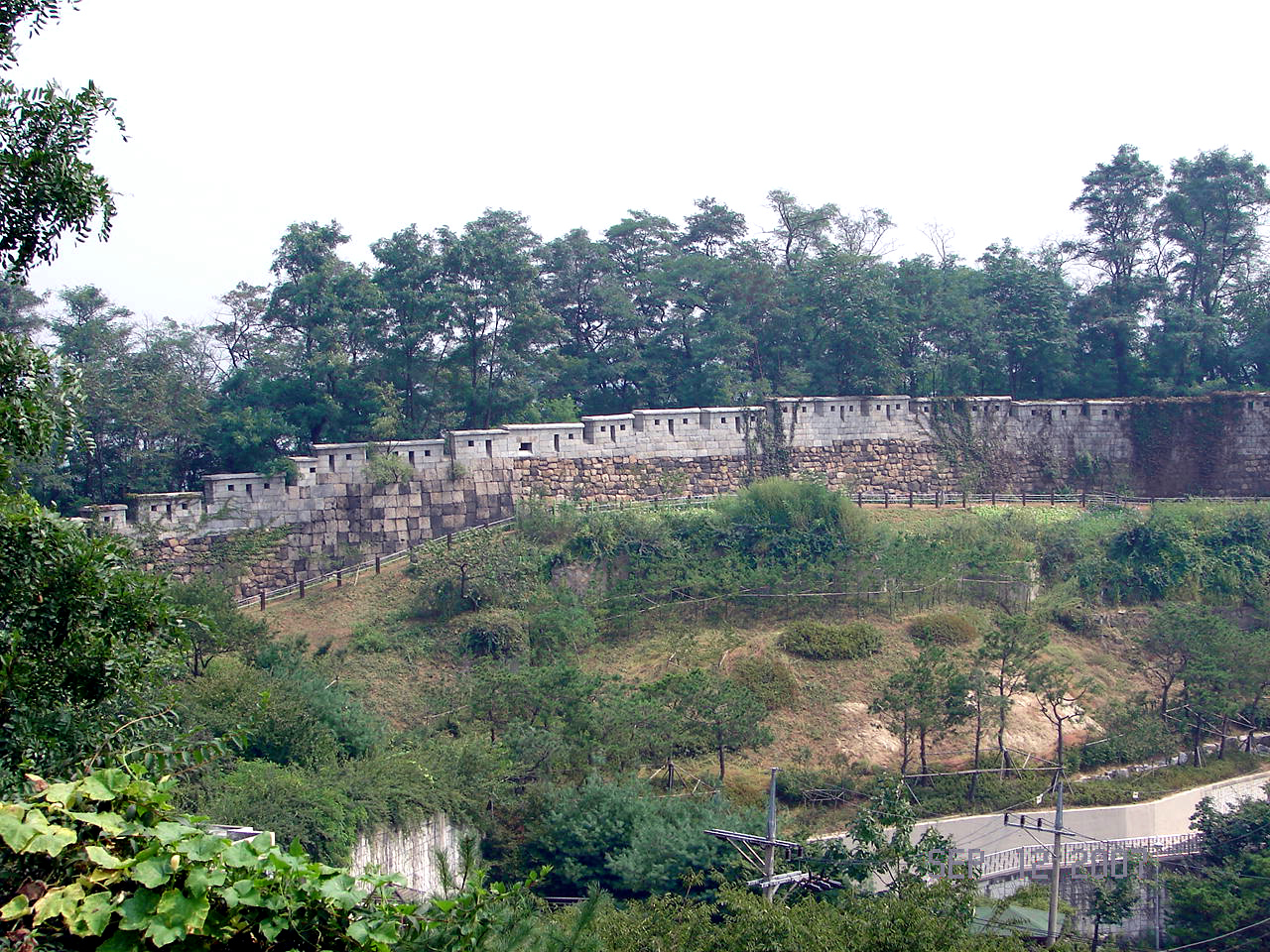
Fortress wall of Seoul on the mountain

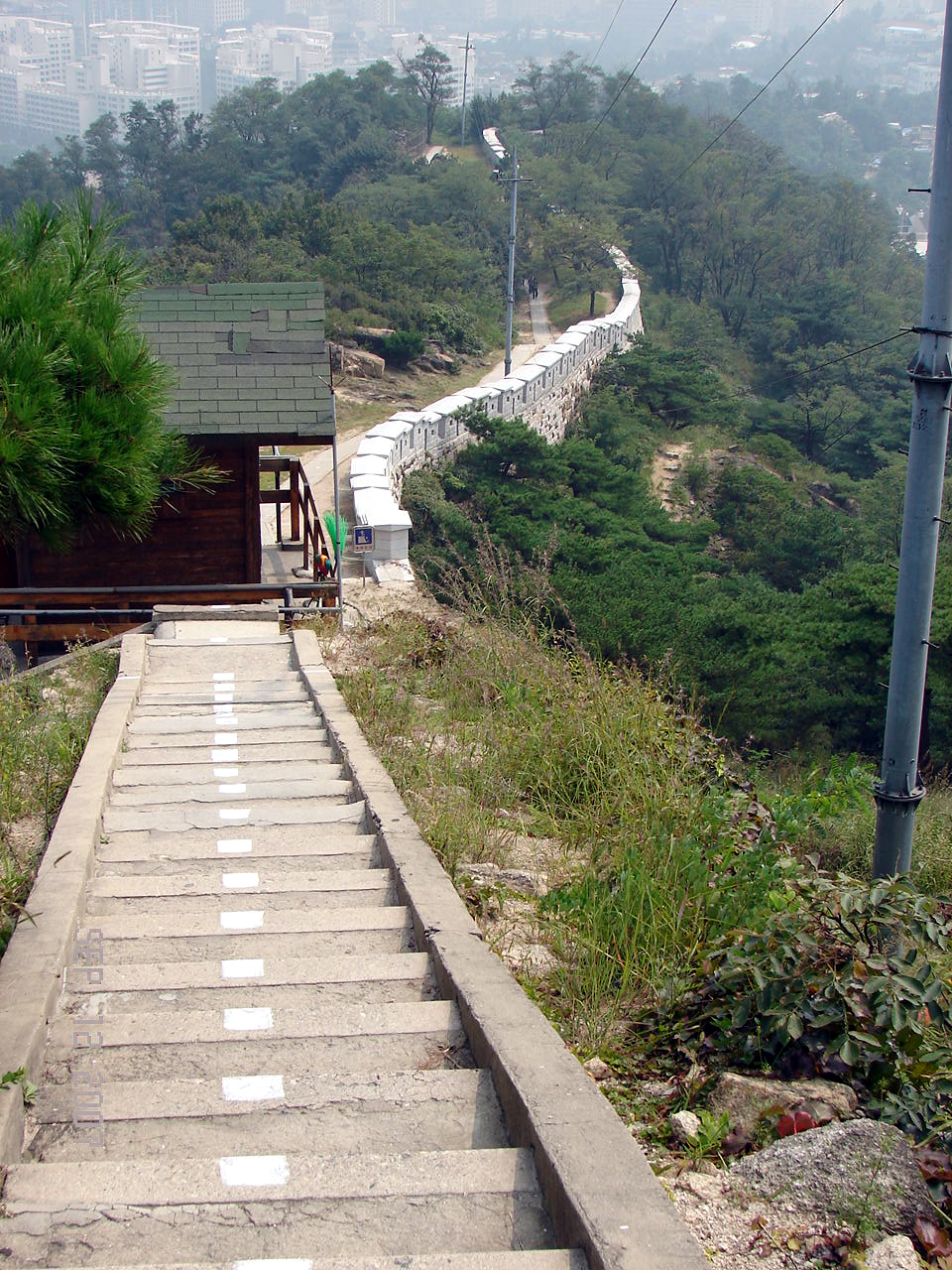
Steps and fort wall

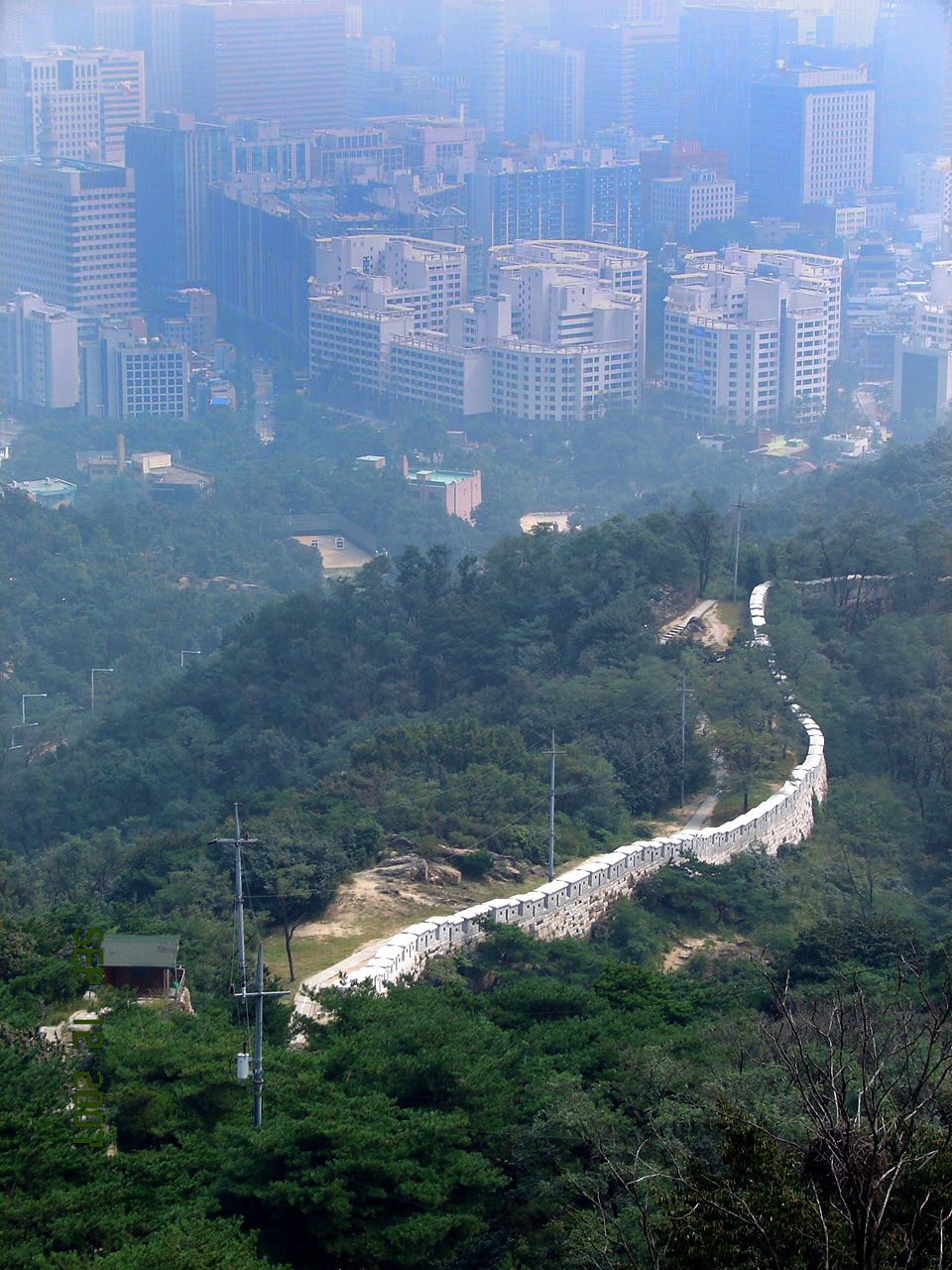
Fort wall overlooking Seoul

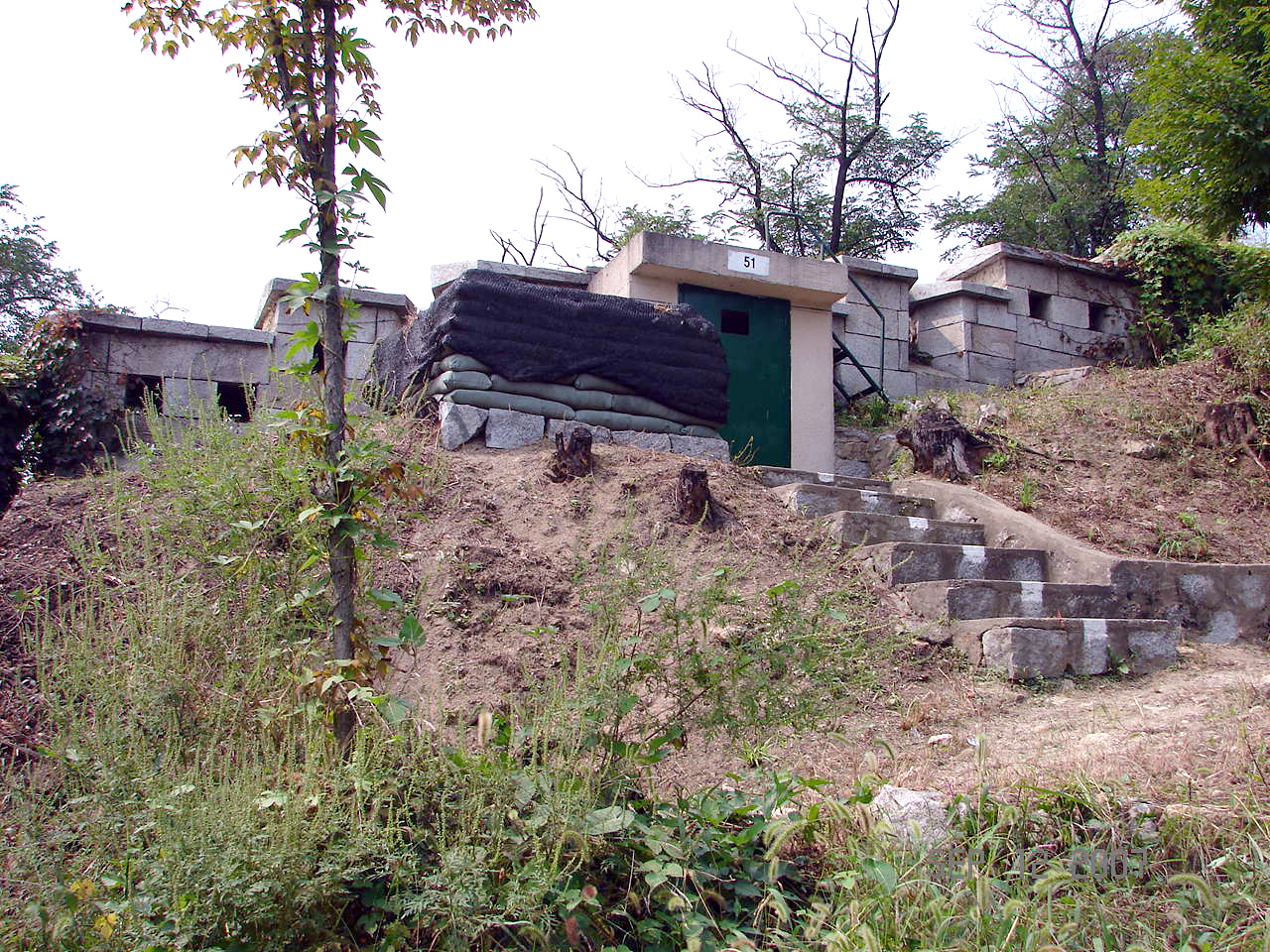
Near the peak

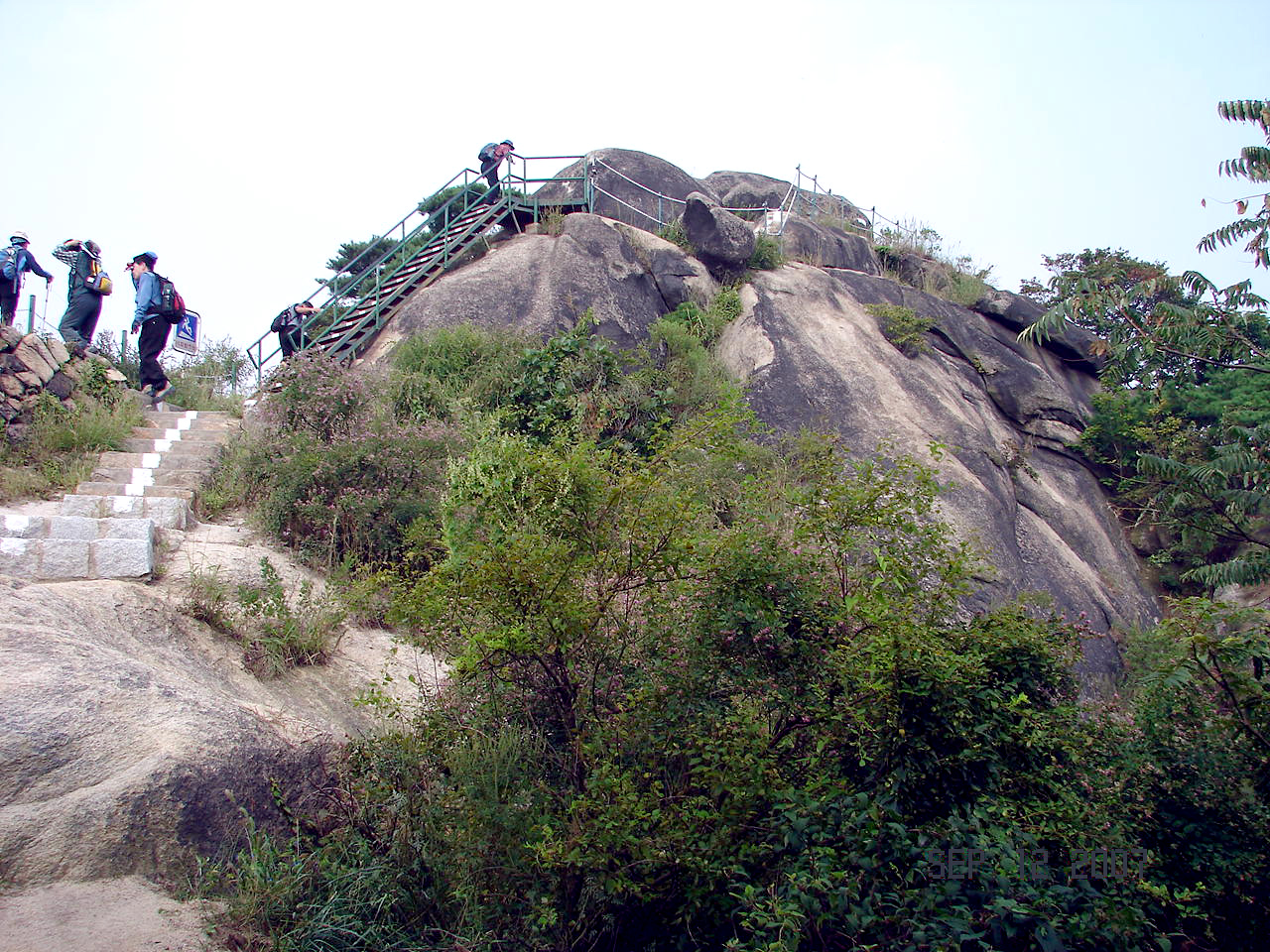
On the top

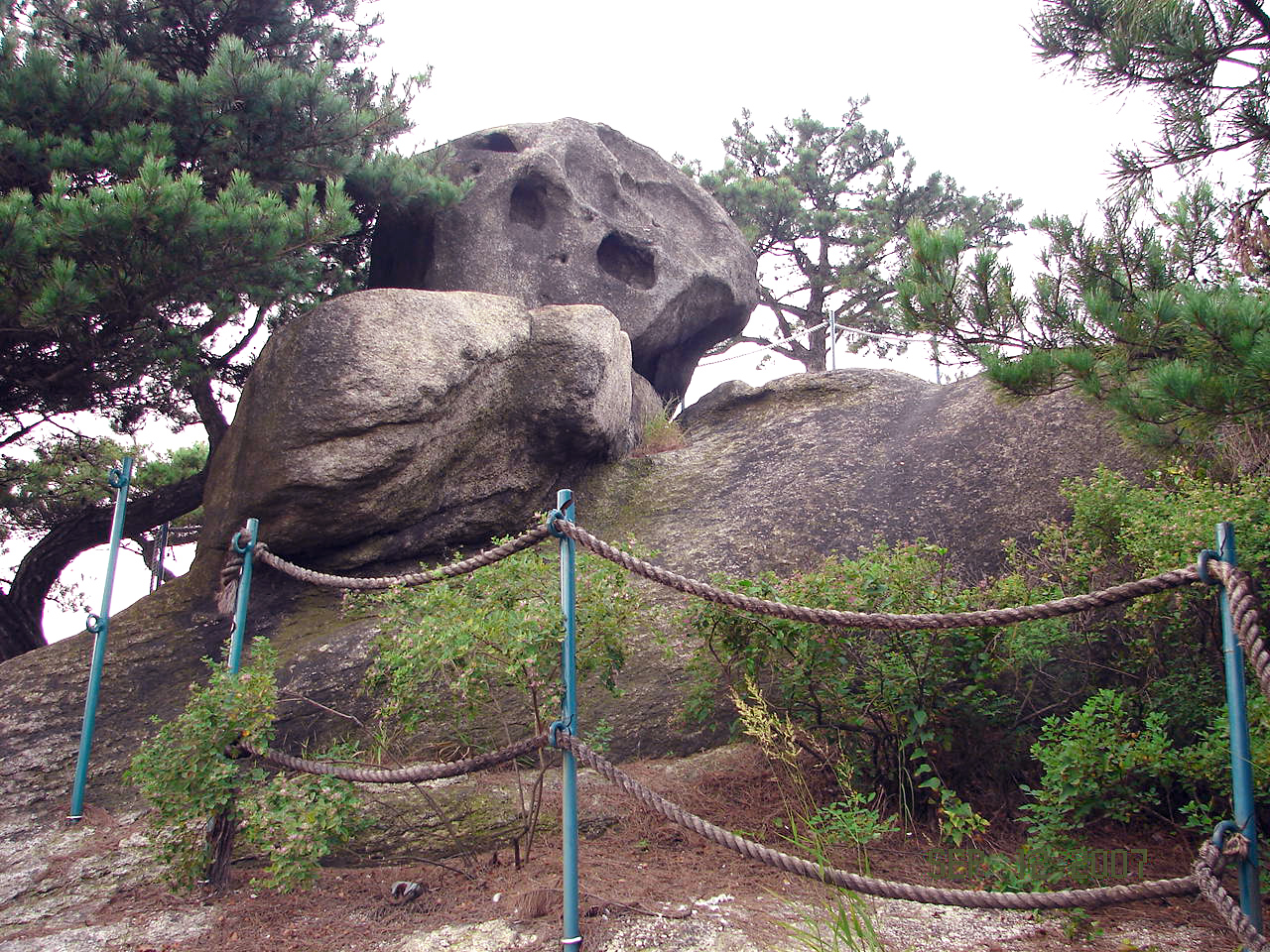
Fort wall reconstruction

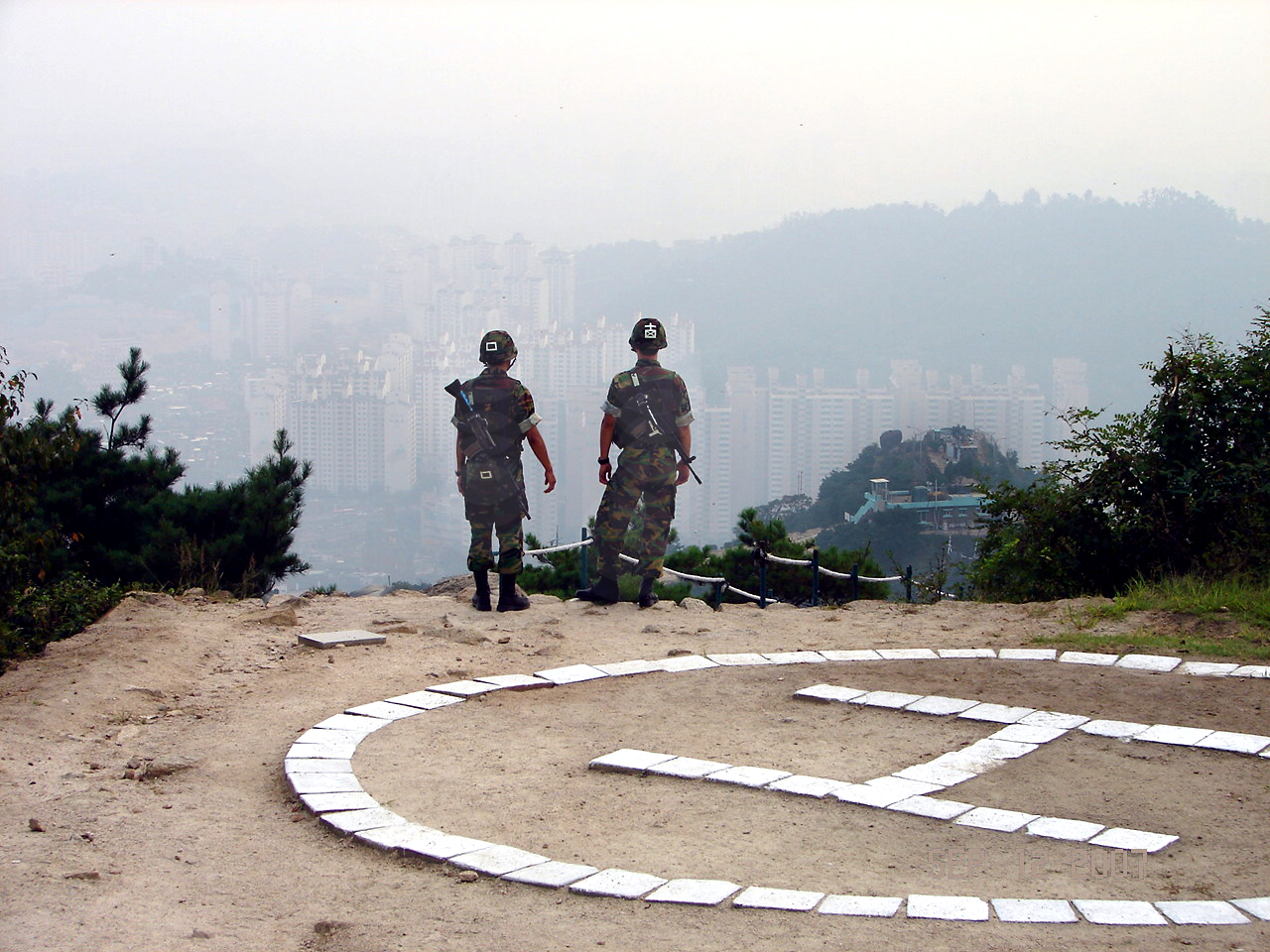
Remaining vigilant

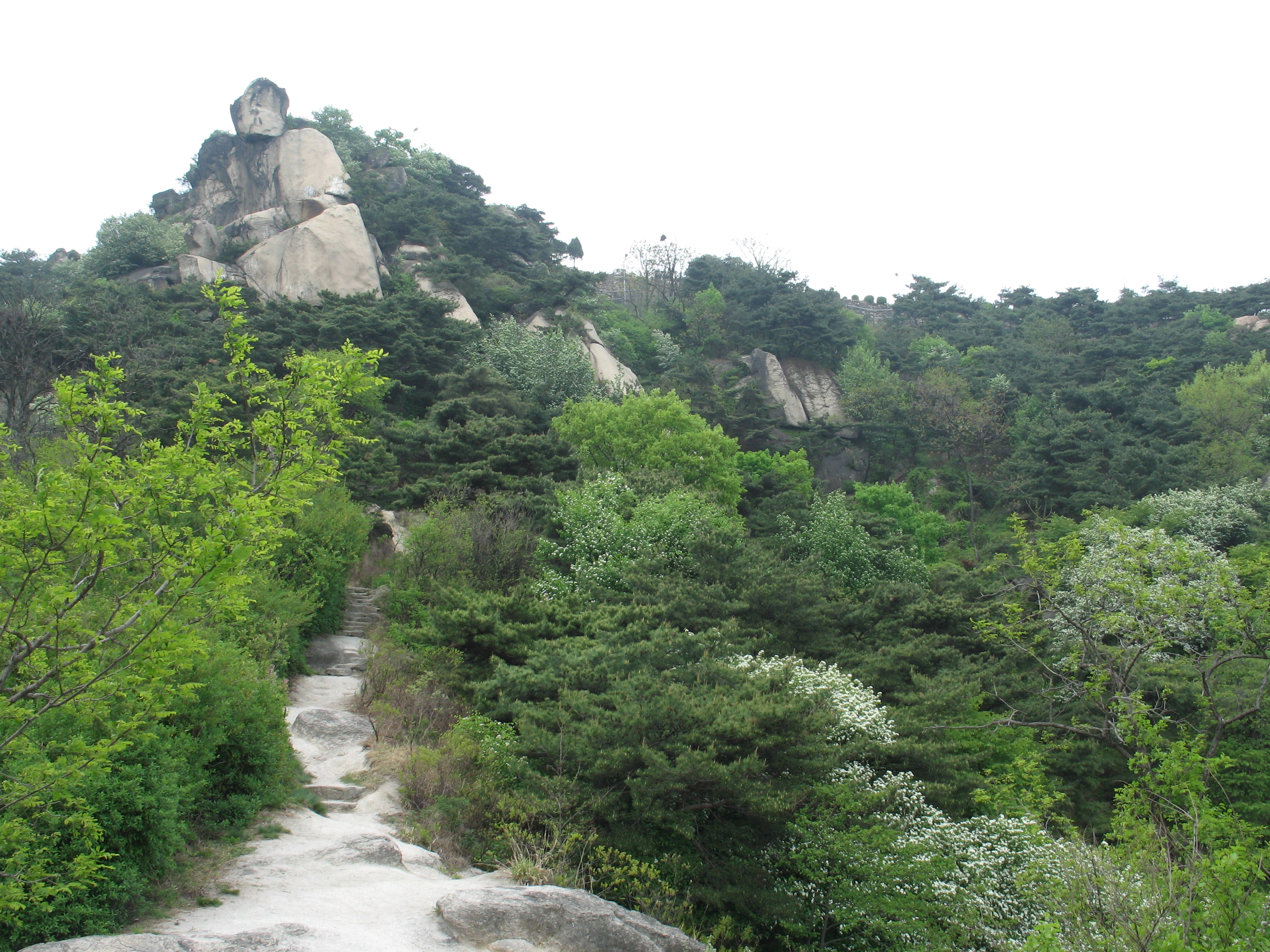
Trail of Inwangsan

== See also ==
- Inwang jesaekdo
- List of mountains in Korea
- List of mountains in Seoul
