= White Pine Creek =

Stream in the state of Idaho

Coordinates: 47°01′54″N 116°43′02″W

White Pine Creek is a stream in Latah and Benewah counties, in the U.S. state of Idaho.

White Pine Creek was named for the abundance of white pine in the area.

== See also ==
- List of rivers of Idaho
