= Hyoja-dong =

Coordinates: 35°50′N 127°06′E

- Interactive map of Hyoja-dong
- Country: South Korea

Area
  - Total: 0.90 km^{2} (0.35 sq mi)

Population (2001)
  - Total: 12,250
  - Density: 14,000/km^{2} (35,000/sq mi)

Korean name
- Hangul: 효자동
- Hanja: 孝子洞
- RR: Hyoja-dong
- MR: Hyoja-dong

Hyoja-dong (Korean: 효자동) is a dong (neighborhood) of Jongno District, Seoul, South Korea.

== See also ==
- Administrative divisions of South Korea
