= Chŏng Sŏn =

Korean painter (1676–1759)

- 정선
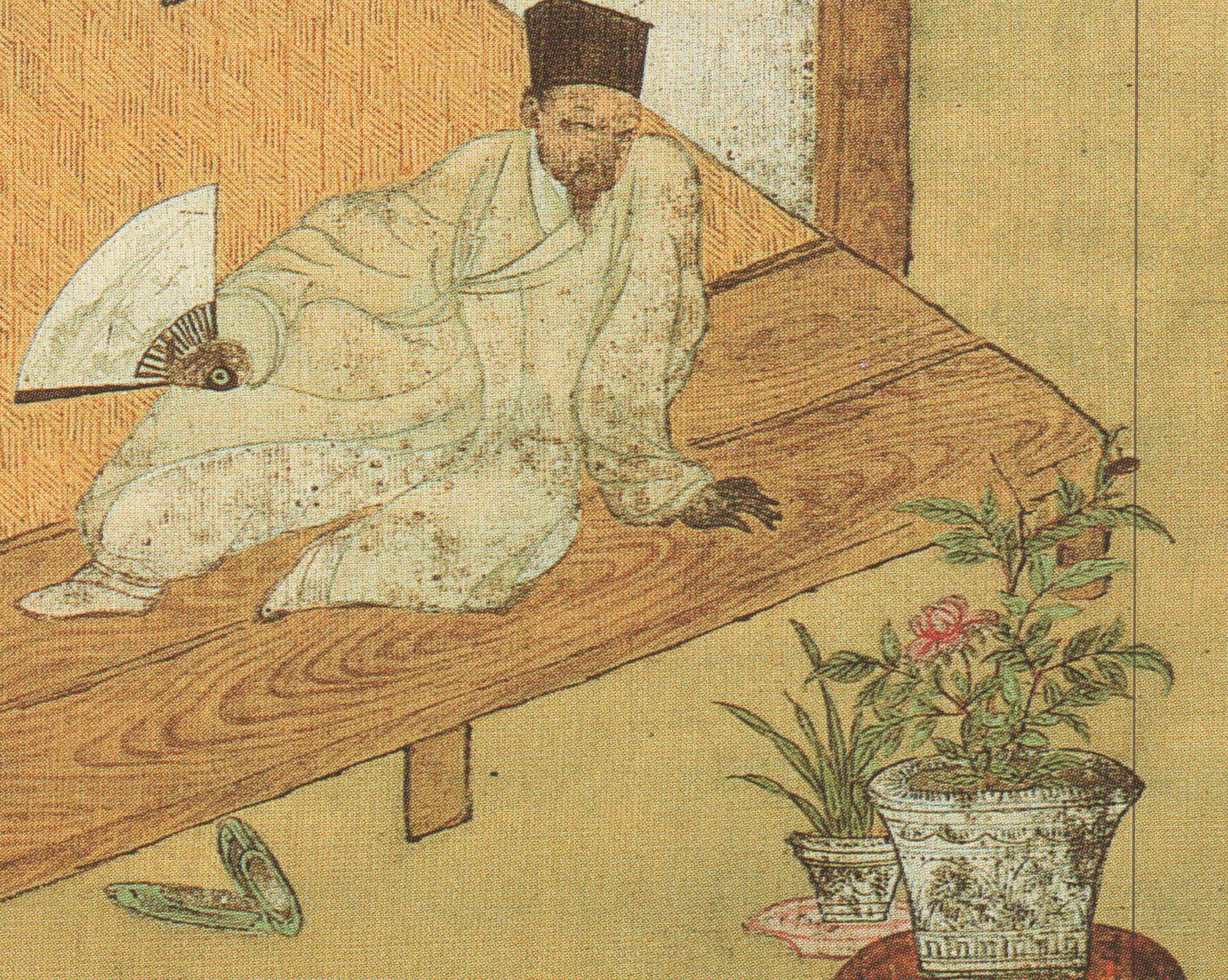
- Detail from Taking a rest after reading books by Chŏng Sŏn, believed to be a self-portrait of the painter.
- Born: 16 February 1676; Seoul, Joseon
- Died: 20 April 1759 (aged 83); Seoul, Joseon
- Known for: Painting, drawing
- Notable work: Inwangjesaekdo; Geumgang jeondo
- Movement: true-view painting

- Chŏng Sŏn
- Hangul: 정선
- Hanja: 鄭敾
- RR: Jeong Seon
- MR: Chŏng Sŏn

Art name
- Hangul: 겸재, 난곡
- Hanja: 謙齋, 蘭谷
- RR: Gyeomjae, Nangok
- MR: Kyŏmjae, Nan'gok

Courtesy name
- Hangul: 원백
- Hanja: 元伯
- RR: Wonbaek
- MR: Wŏnbaek

Chŏng Sŏn (Korean: 정선; Hanja: 鄭敾; 1676 – 20 April 1759) was a Korean landscape painter, also known by the art names Gyeomjae and Nangok and courtesy name Wonbaek. His works include ink and oriental water paintings, such as Inwangjesaekdo (1751), Geumgang jeondo (1734), and Ingokjeongsa (1742), as well as numerous "true-view" landscape paintings on the subject of Korea and the history of its culture. He is counted among the most famous Korean painters. The landscape paintings that he produced reflect most of the geographical features of Korea. His style is realistic rather than abstract.

== Biography ==
Chŏng was born on 16 February 1676, in the Jongno District of Seoul, in the Cheongun-dong neighborhood. He was the eldest son of Jeong Si-ik (1638–1689), the descendant of an illustrious and gentry family that originally came from Gwangju. Soon in infancy, he was noted for his artistic talents and is said to have painted daily, with a prolific output until old age. But his family was so poor that he couldn't become a scholar-painter (a yangban painting for leisure). Nevertheless, he was introduced in a circle of powerful neighbors and was, on their recommendation, allowed to work for the Dohwaseo (Joseon Bureau of Paintings) and also created landscapes for patrons and clients.

In his 36th year (1711), he toured Mt. Geumgang with Pak Tae-yu (1648–1746), the local governor, and produced the 13-paintings Album Pungak Mountain, Sin-myo Year. The next year, another trip to Mt. Geumgang produced the 30 paintings Album Realistic Representations of Sea and Mountains. Both albums were augmented by various poems written by Chŏng Sŏn's protectors. His self-chosen pen name Gyeomjae (i.e. "humble study") was reflecting this asymmetrical relationship.

In 1716, in his 41st year, he was granted a tenure of Geomgyosu (兼敎授; professor extraordinary) at Gwansanggam (觀象監; the Office for Observance of Natural Phenomena). This was taking into account the fact that Chŏng Sŏn was from beginning proficient at Book of Changes(周易) and Astronomy. But this gave him further impetus... and an official position. He served as district magistrate of Hayang (1721–1726), of Cheongha (c. 1733), and of Yangcheon (1740–1745). Later in life, he was honored by King Yeongjo, who bestowed on him the official title of the fourth rank in 1754 and the second rank in 1756.

== Significance ==
Chŏng is one of the most famous Korean painters. He inspired other Korean artists to follow suit, leaving a lasting impact on Korean art. He was the most eminent painter in the late Joseon period. Chŏng explored the scenic beauty of the capital city of Hanyang (Seoul), the Han River, the Sea of Japan, and the Diamond Mountain. He is the first painter of true-view Korean landscapes. Differing from earlier techniques and traditional Chinese styles, he created a new style of painting depicting the virtues of Korea.

By the end of the decade, Chŏng had developed his own, more realistic style, likely under the influence of the [Silhak] movement. This set him apart from the then-prevailing Chinese literati tradition of idealised and abstract landscape art. His grandson, Jeong Hwang (鄭榥, 1737–?), displayed the true-view landscape style in addition to genre painting.

== Style ==
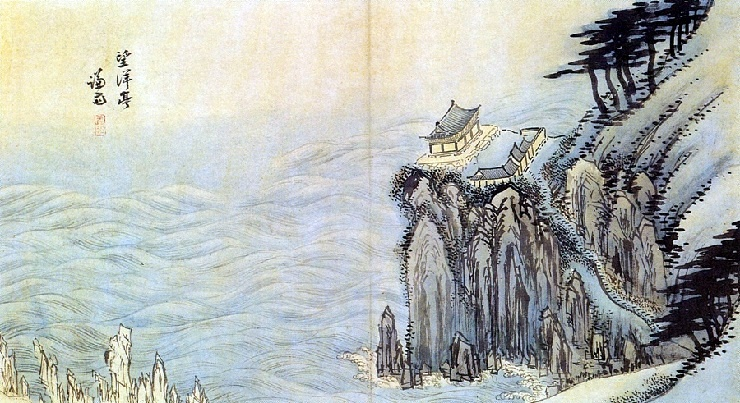

Chŏng was one of the few known Korean painters to depart from traditional Chinese styles. It is reported that he frequently left his studio and painted the world around him, as he could see it. His paintings are classified as part of the Southern School, but he developed his own style by realistically portraying natural scenes such as mountains and streams with bold strokes of his brush.

A major characteristic of his work is intermixed dark and light areas, created by layers of ink wash and lines. His mountains are punctuated by forests, which in turn are lightened by mists and waterfalls. Vegetation is made from dots, a technique that bears the influence of Chinese painter Mi Fei (1052–1107). Jeong's style would influence generations of Korean artists, and become one of the iconic images of Korean nationalism.

== Gallery ==
#	Title	Hangul	Year	Technique & size HxL	Location	Illustration
1.	Inwangjesaekdo	인왕제색도	1751	ink-and-oil painting 79.2 cm × 138.2 cm	Leeum, Samsung Museum of Art	
2.	Geumgang jeondo Spring View of Mt. Diamond	금강전도	1734	Ink and oriental water color on paper 130.7 cm × 94.1 cm	Ho-Am Art Museum	
3.	Geumgang jeondo Complete View	금강전도	1750s	color on silk 33.3 x 54.6 cm	Order of St. Benedict; Waegwan Abbey	
4.	Pungaknaesan chongramdo Autumn View of Mt. Diamond	풍악내산총람도 楓岳內山摠覽圖	1740s	color on silk 100.8×73.8 cm	Gansong Art Museum	
5.	Ingok Yugeo; Jeon Seon's secluded house below Mt. Inwang	인곡유거도 仁谷幽居圖	1742	ink and slight color on paper 27.5 x 27.3 cm	Gansong Art Museum	
6.	Soyojeong	소요정 逍遙亭	18th century	Ink and oriental water color on silk 130.7 cm × 94.1 cm	Private collection	
7.	Cheongpunggye	청풍계 淸風溪	18th century	Ink and oriental water color on silk 96.5 x 36.1 cm	Museum of Korea University	
8.	Bakyeon Fall	박연폭포 朴淵瀑布	18th century	Ink and oriental water color on paper 119.4×51.9 cm	Private collection	
9.	Gwangjin	광진 廣津	18th century	Ink and oriental water color on silk 20 x 31.5 cm	Gansong Art Museum	
10.	Jaha-dong a village in Jongno District	자하동 紫霞洞	18th century	Ink and oriental water color on paper 33.7 x 29.5 cm	Gansong Art Museum	
11.	Gaehwasa Temple	개화사	18th century	Ink and oriental water color on paper 31 x 24.8 cm	Gansong Art Museum	
12.	Dongjakjin	동작진 銅雀津	18th century	Ink and oriental water color on paper 18.5 x L=27.5 cm	Private collection	
13.	Gwiraejeong	귀래정 歸來亭	18th century	Ink and oriental water color on paper 23 x 25 cm	Private collection	
14.	Isujeong	이수정 二水亭	18th century	Ink and oriental water color on silk 23 x 25 cm	Private collection	
15.	Dosan Seowon	도산서원도	18th century		Private collection	
16.	Jukseoru	죽서루	1738	Ink and oriental water color on paper 32.3 x 57.8 cm	Gansong Art Museum	
17.	Changuimun	창의문 彰義門	18th century	Ink and oriental water color on paper 29.5 x 33.2 cm	National Museum of Korea	
18.	Ingokjeongsa	인곡정사 仁谷精舍	1742	Ink and oriental water color on paper 22.5 x 32.5 cm	Private collection	
19.	Mangyangjeong	망양정	18th century	Ink and oriental water color on paper 32.3 x 57.8 cm	Gansong Art Museum	
20.	Chuil hanmyo 가을날 한가로운 고양이; Leisurely cat on a fall day	추일한묘 秋日閑猫	18th century			
21.	Yuksangmyodo	육상묘도	1739	Ink and oriental water color on silk 146.5 x 63 cm	Private collection	
22.	Seonyubong	선유봉 仙遊峰	1740s	cm	collection	
23.	Soakru a pavilion below Mt. Seongsan	소악루 小岳樓		tint on paper cm	Gansong Art Museum	
24.	Pungak Mountain, Sin-myo Year; Album on tour with Pak Tae-yu (1648–1746)	辛卯年楓岳圖帖	1711			
25.	Realistic Representations of Sea and Mountains (no longer extant)		1712			
26.	Nosong Yeongji	노송영지 老松靈芝	1755			

== See also ==
- Korean painting
- List of Korean painters

== Sources ==
=== English sources ===
1. Museum 겸재정선 소개 [Introduction of Gyeomjae Jeong Seon]. Jeong Seon's Museum.
2. the MET Lee Soyoung. Based on original work by Ahn Hwi-Joon (October 2004). "Mountain and Water: Korean Landscape Painting, 1400–1800". Heilbrunn Timeline of Art History. the MET.
3. MET. Yi Song-mi (1998). "Artistic Tradition and the Depiction of Reality: True-View Landscape Painting of the Joseon Dynasty". In Judith G. Smith (ed.). Arts_of_Korea. Metropolitan Museum of Art, New York. pp. 330–365 and 464–466. ISBN 9780300085785.
  catalog of the June 5, 1998—Jan. 24, 1999 exhibition. (fully available online as PDF).
4. KAA "Korean Genre Painting" (PDF). The International Journal of Korean Art and Archaeology. 3. National Museum of Korea. 2009. ISSN 2005-1115. Archived from the original (PDF) on 2014-12-13. original seems dead
5. Chung Ah-young (15 September 2009). "Jeong Seon's Paintings Brought to Life". The Korea Times. Archived from the original on 22 December 2014. Original is largely quicker.
6. Pratt, Keith; Rutt, Richard (16 December 2013). Korea: A Historical and Cultural Dictionary. Routledge. ISBN 978-1-136-79393-6.
7. Kim Kumja-paik (1992). "Chŏng Sŏn (1676–1759): His Life and Career". Artibus Asiae. 52 (3/4): 329–343. doi:10.2307/3249894. JSTOR 3249894. Jstor subscription
8. "Gyeomjae Jeong Seon Memorial Museum, Korea". Asia–Europe Foundation.

=== linked to dbpia ===
1. 안휘준 (Ahn Hwi-Joon) (June 2005). "謙齋 鄭敾(1676 -1759)의 瀟湘八景圖" [Jeong Seon's Paintings of "The Eight Views of the Xiao and Xiang Rivers"]. Art History Forum. 20: 7–48.
  - linked at academic.naver
  - Xiaoxiangbajin i.e. Sosangpalgyeongdo is described at Canterbury Thesis
2. 안휘준 (Ahn Hwi-Joon) (June 2012). "겸재 정선(1676~1759)과 그의 진경산수화, 어떻게 볼 것인가" [A New Understanding of Jeong Seon (1676~1759) and his True-View Landscape Painting]. The Korean Historical Review. 214: 1–30.
  - linked at academic.naver
3. 강관식 (Gang Gwansik) (December 2006). "謙齋 鄭敾의 天文學 兼敎授 出仕와 <金剛全圖>의 天文易學的 解釋" [A Study on the duties of Gyeomje Jeong Seon (謙齋 鄭敾, 1676–1759) as extraordinary Professor in Astronomy and the Interpretation of the <General View of Geumgang Mountain 金剛全圖> from the Viewpoint of the Science of Astronomy-Divination(天文易學)]. 미술사학, Misulsahakbo, Reviews on Art History. 27: 137–194.
  - linked at academic.naver
  - linked at KCI
4. 김진경 (Kim Jin-gyeong) (April 2013). 겸재 진경산수화에 나타난 남·북종 화법융합의 독창성 연구 [North-South Convergency and originality on interpretation of the GyeomJae True-View Landscape Painting]. Yang-Ming Studies (34): 257–290. doi:10.17088/tksyms.2013..34.010.
  - linked at academic.naver
