= Jeon (surname) =

Jeon / Jun
- Pronunciation: Korean pronunciation: [tɕʌn]
- Language: Korean

- Jeon
- Hangul: 전
- Hanja: 全; 田; 錢
- RR: Jeon
- MR: Chŏn

Jeon (전), also often spelled Jun, Chun or Chon, is a common Korean family name. As of the South Korean census of 2000, there were 687,867 people with this name in South Korea. It can be written with three different hanja, each with different meanings and indicating different lineages.

- 全 (온전할 전 onjeonhal jeon, "whole"). This is the most common character, used by 493,419 people in 153,208 households according to the 2000 Census. The surname has a Baekje origin. It is also said that when Goryeo dynasty fell, many changed their royal surname Wang to Jeon (全) / Ok (玉) to avoid severe persecution by the succeeding Joseon dynasty.
- 田 (밭 전 bat jeon, "field"). This is the second-most common character, used by 188,354 people in 58,895 households. The surname has a Goryeo origin.
- 錢 (돈 전 don jeon, "money"). This is the least common character, used by 6,094 people in 1,883 households.

In a study by the National Institute of Korean Language based on 2007 application data for South Korean passports, it was found that 67% of people with this family name spelled it in Latin letters as Jeon in their passports, while 23% spelled it Jun, and 5% spelled it Chun. Rarer alternative spellings (the remaining 5%) included Chon, Cheon, Jean, Jeun, Jen, Jhun, and Zeon.

== People ==
- Annie Chun, South Korean entrepreneur, founder of Annie Chun's
- Jeon Bae-soo (born 1970), South Korean actor
- Jeon Bong-jun (1855–1895), South Korean activist
- Jeon Boram (born 1986), South Korean singer and actress
- Byeong Sam Jeon (born 1977), South Korean artist
- Jeon Byung-guk (born 1987), South Korean former footballer
- Jeon Chae-eun (born 2005), South Korean actress
- Jeon Da-hye (born 1983), South Korean short track speed skater
- Daniel Chun (born 1980), American comedy writer
- Jeon Do-yeon (born 1973), South Korean actress
- Chun Doo-hwan (1931–2021), South Korean politician
- Jeon Eun-ha (born 1993), South Korean footballer
- Ha Ji-won (born Jeon Hae-rim, 1978), South Korean actress
- Heejin (born Jeon Hee-jin, 2000), South Korean singer, member of girl group Artms
- Jeon Hye-bin (born 1983), South Korean actress and singer
- Jeon Hye-jin (actress, born 1976), South Korean actress
- Jeon Hye-jin (actress, born 1988), South Korean actress
- Jeon Hyeok-jin (born 1995), South Korean badminton player
- Jeon Hyeong-pil (1906–1962), Korean art collector
- Jun Hyo-seong (born 1989), South Korean singer and actress
- Jun Hyun-moo (born 1977), South Korean host and television personality
- Chun In-gee (born 1994), South Korean professional golfer
- Jeon In-hwa (born 1965), South Korean actress
- Jeon In-kwon (born 1954), South Korean singer-songwriter
- Jun Jae-youn (born 1983), South Korean badminton player
- Jeon Ji-yoon (born 1990), South Korean singer-songwriter
- Jeon Ji-woo (born 1996), South Korean singer and rapper, member of co-ed group Kard
- John Chun (1928–2013), Korean automotive engineering designer
- John H. Chun (born 1970), American lawyer
- Jeon Jong-seo (born 1994), South Korean actress
- Jeon Joonho (born 1969), South Korean artist
- Jeon Jun-ho (born 1969), South Korean baseball player
- Jeon Jun-hyeok (born 2003), South Korean actor and model
- Jungkook (born Jeon Jung-kook, 1997), South Korean singer, member of boy band BTS
- Jeon Mi-do (born 1982), South Korean actress and singer
- Jeon Mi-seon (1970–2019), South Korean actress
- Jeon Min-seo (born 2003), South Korean actress
- Jeon No-min (born 1966), South Korean actor
- Jeon Ok (1911–1969), Korean actress and singer
- Jon Pyong-ho (1926–2014), North Korean general and politician
- Jeon Sang-guk (born 1940), South Korean author
- Jeon Seok-ho (born 1984), South Korean actor
- Jeon So-nee (born 1991), South Korean actress
- Jeon So-min (born 1986), South Korean actress
- Somin (singer) (born Jeon So-min, 1996), South Korean singer, member of co-ed group Kard
- Jeon Somi (born 2001), South Korean-Canadian singer
- Soyeon (born Jeon So-yeon, 1998), South Korean rapper and record producer, member of girl group (G)I-dle
- Jeon So-young (born 2003), South Korean actress
- Jeon Soo-jin (born 1988), South Korean actress
- Jeon Soo-kyeong (born 1966), South Korean actress
- Jeon Sung-woo (born 1987), South Korean actor
- Jeon Tae-il (1948–1970), South Korean activist
- Jun Tae-soo (1984–2018), South Korean actor
- Chon Tae-poong (born 1986), American-born South Korean YouTuber and former basketball player
- Wonwoo (born Jeon Won-woo, 1996), South Korean singer, member of boy band Seventeen
- Jeon Woo-chi, Taoist scholar
- Jeon Ye-seo (born 1981), South Korean actress
- Jeon Yeo-been (born 1989), South Korean actress
- Jeon Yeo-ok (born 1959), South Korean politician
- Yeojin Jeon (born 1984), South Korean actress

== See also ==
- List of Korean family names
- Korean name
