= Donggwoldo =

19th-century Korean painting

Donggwoldo 동궐도
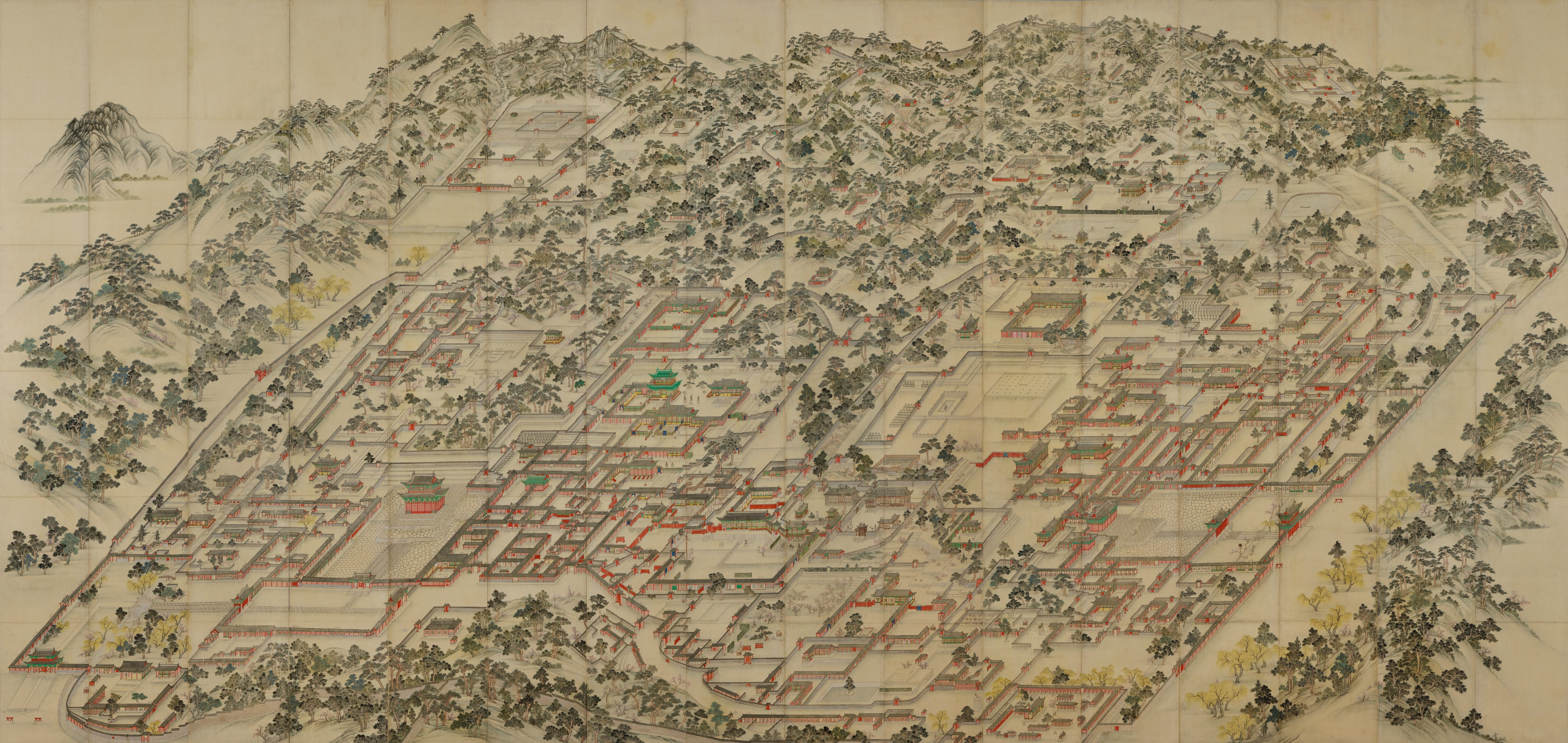
- Artist: Presumably royal painters
- Year: Around 1830
- Type: Ink on paper and silk
- Dimensions: 274 cm × 583 cm (108 in × 230 in)
- Location: Korea University Museum Dong-A University Museum

- Donggwoldo
- Hangul: 동궐도
- Hanja: 東闕圖
- Revised Romanization: Donggwoldo
- McCune–Reischauer: Tonggwŏldo

Donggwoldo (Korean: 동궐도; Hanja: 東闕圖; lit. 'Painting of the Eastern Palaces') is a representative Korean painting of the early 19th century, depicting the two royal palaces, Changdeokgung and Changgyeonggung during the Joseon Dynasty. Donggwol is an alternative name of Changdeokgung, located to the East of the main royal palace of the dynasty, Gyeongbokgung. However, the picture also includes Changgyeonggung, an adjacent palace to the former.

In 2012, the painting was used as the basis of a restoration project for the Buyongjeong pavilion in the rear garden of the Changdeokgung.

== Features ==
The picture from a bird's-eye view perspective captures the whole scape of the palaces surrounded by mountains and hills from a right top angle. Two versions of the same picture have survived to the present; one with a width of 583 cm and a height of 274 cm is stored in Korea University Museum, while the other with a width of 576 cm and a height of 273 is in Dong-A University Museum. Donggwoldo is designated as the 249th National Treasure of South Korea.

Donggwoldo is on a folding screen (byeongpung) made of paper, silk and wood. The creation date is presumed to be between 1826 and 1830 given the fact that it depicts the "Jeonsa" [pavilion], installed in the 26th year of King Sunjo, and "Gyeongbokjeon" [pavilion], demolished in the 30th year of the same king. The author is unknown but presumed to be a royal painter from Dohwaseo, the governmental office in charge of paintings during the period. The [painting] itself is regarded more as a significant source for the research on Korean royal palaces rather than for its artistic values. Since the [picture] is visually more detailed than other similar paintings, such as Donggwoldohyeong (東闕圖形) and Gunggwolji (宮闕志), it serves well as historical evidence and provides many clues to studies on building arrangements and features during that period.

== Gallery ==
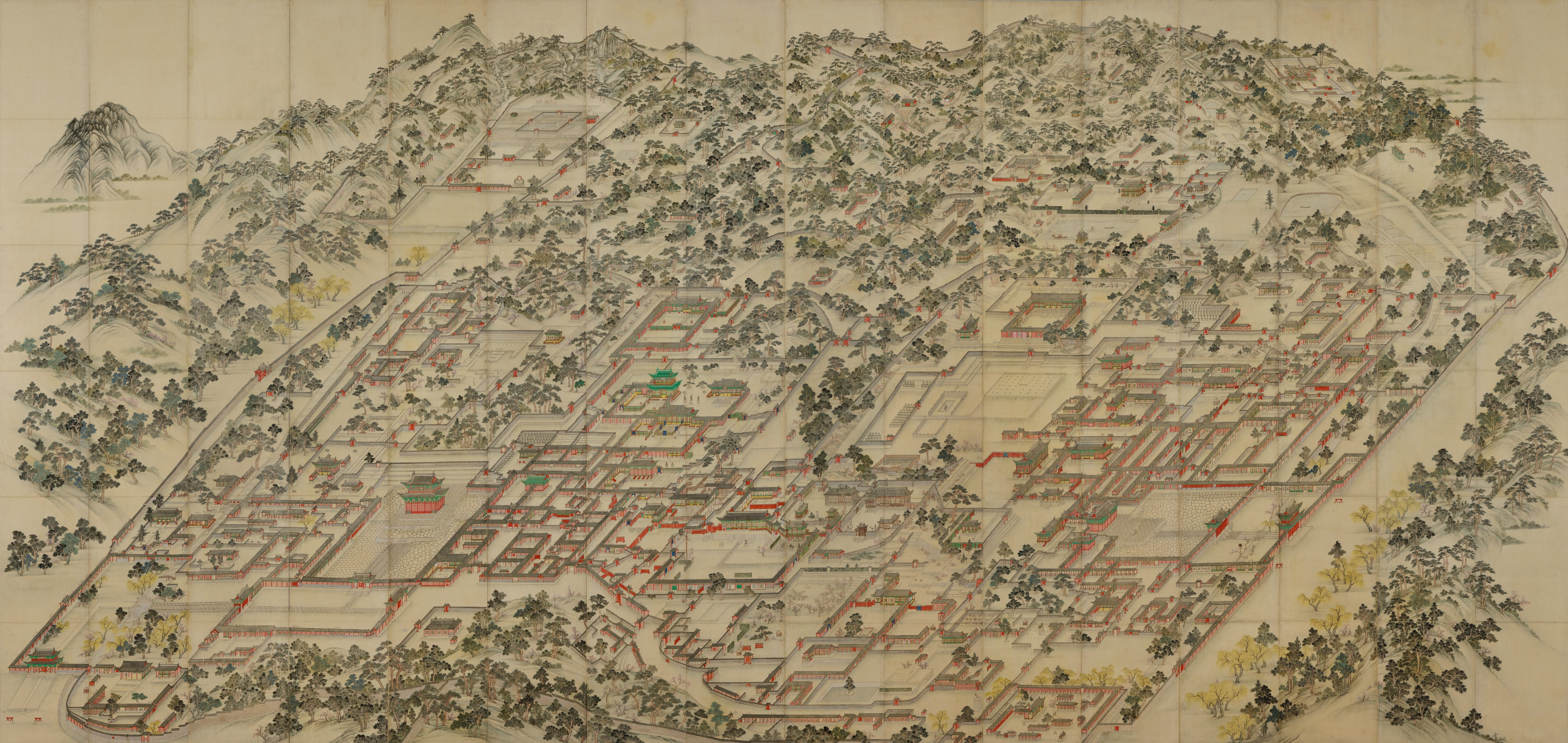
Dong-A University Museum's version

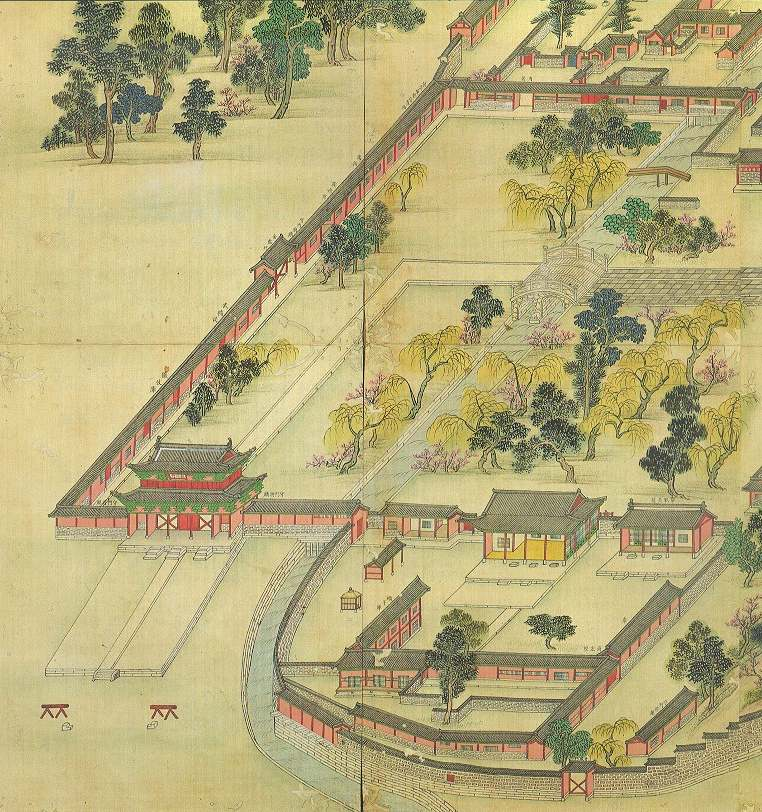
Donhwamun, one of the main Changdeokgung palace entrances and its vicinity.

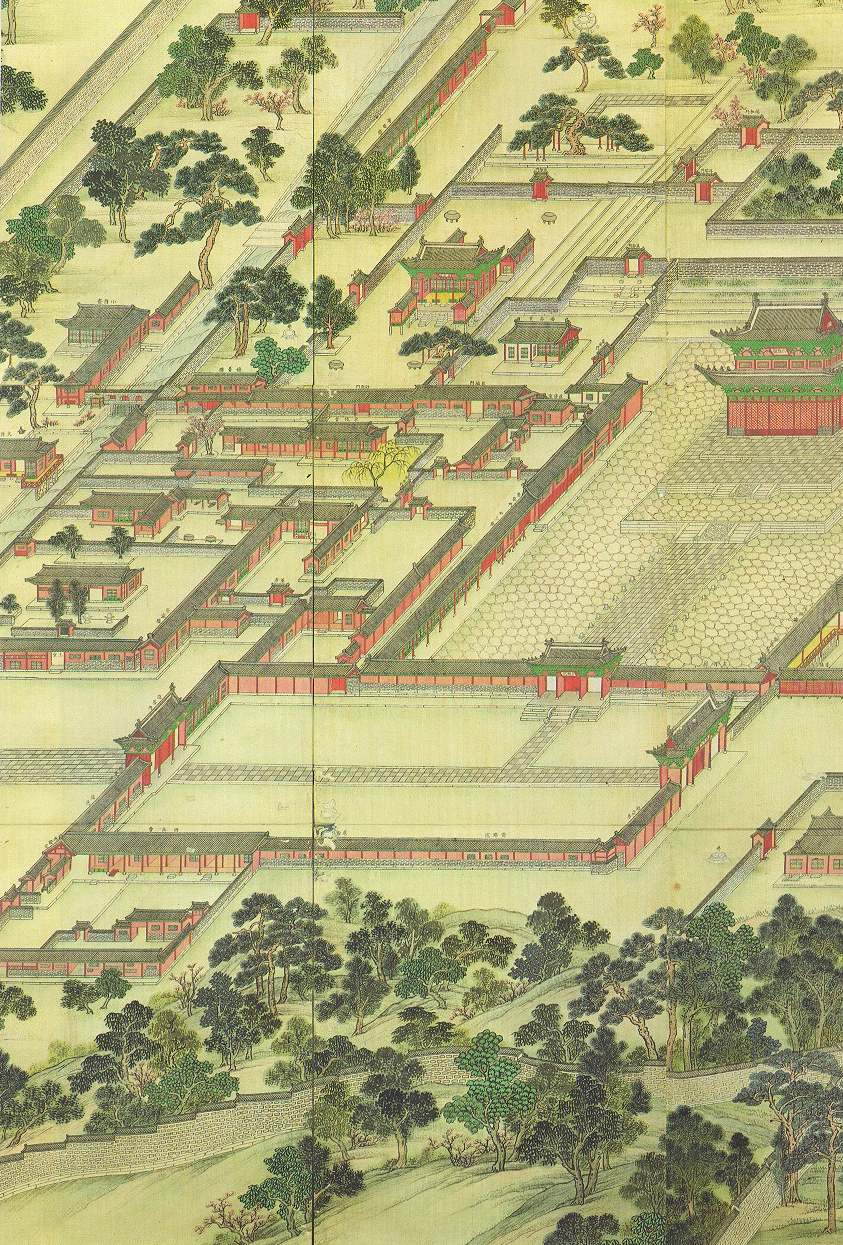
Jinseonmun, a gate inside of Changdeokgung.

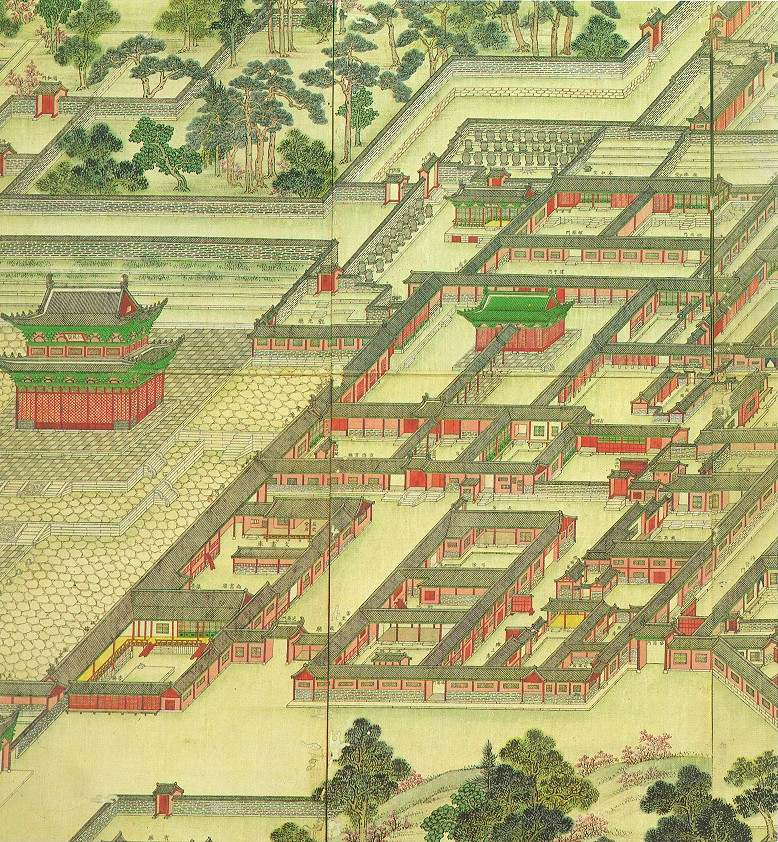
Seonjeongjeon hall at Changdeokgung and its vicinity in Donggwoldo.

== See also ==
- Uigwe – 15th century Joseon historical documents
- Irworobongdo – Korean painted folding screen
- Geumgang jeondo – 1734 landscape painting by Jeong Seon
- Inwang jesaekdo – 1751 painting by Jeong Seon

== Future readings ==
- Han, Yeong-u. (2007) 동궐도 Donggwoldo, Painting of Eastern Palace (in Korean), Hyohyung Publishing Co. ISBN 978-89-5872-041-6
