= Geumgang in autumn =

18th century Korean landscape painting

Overview of the Diamond Mountains in Autumn
- PungakNaesanChongramDo (풍악내산총람도 楓岳內山摠覽圖) (Korean)
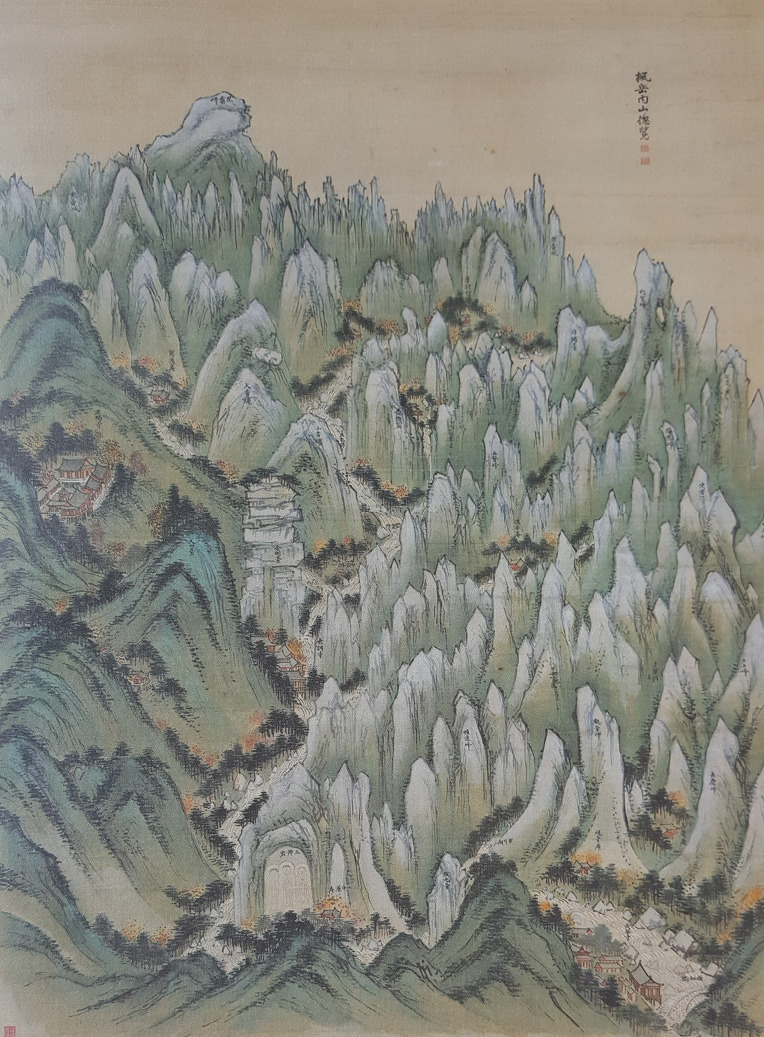
- Artist: Jeong Seon
- Type: Ink and light colors on paper
- Dimensions: 100. cm × 73.8 cm (39 in × 29.1 in)
- Location: Gansong Art Museum

Pungaknaesan chongramdo (풍악내산총람도 楓岳內山摠覽圖) is a famous landscape painted by Jeong Seon during the reign of King Yeongjo. The title literally means "Overview of Mt. Pungak", the Autumn name of the Diamond Mountains. The painting is housed at the Gansong Art Museum.

== Analysis ==
Jeong Seon produced many paintings of Mt. Geumgangsan. This painting is special, due to the choice of the season (Autumn). Moreover, quite all remarkable places are explicitly named. The painting is of Naegeumgang, the Inner Mt. Geumgangsan and is obviously to be compared with the Geumgang jeondo.

On the bottom right, one can see a preeminent representation of the Rainbow bridge (Bihong—gyo, 飛虹橋), an arched bridge near the Changansa Temple. As documented by several scholar-officials who traveled in the area, however, this bridge was destroyed by flood in 1723. This rather indicates that the painting was done from sketches previously drawn, in the 1711-1712 travels to Geumgangsan, rather than painted from an immediate view in the 1740s. In this case, true-view landscape painting should be perceived as 진경산수화, 眞景山水畵, jinkyung landscape painting, meaning truthful-painting and not as 실경산수화, 實景山水畵 meaning real-view. The next travel of Jeong Seon to Mt. Geumgang was in 1747.

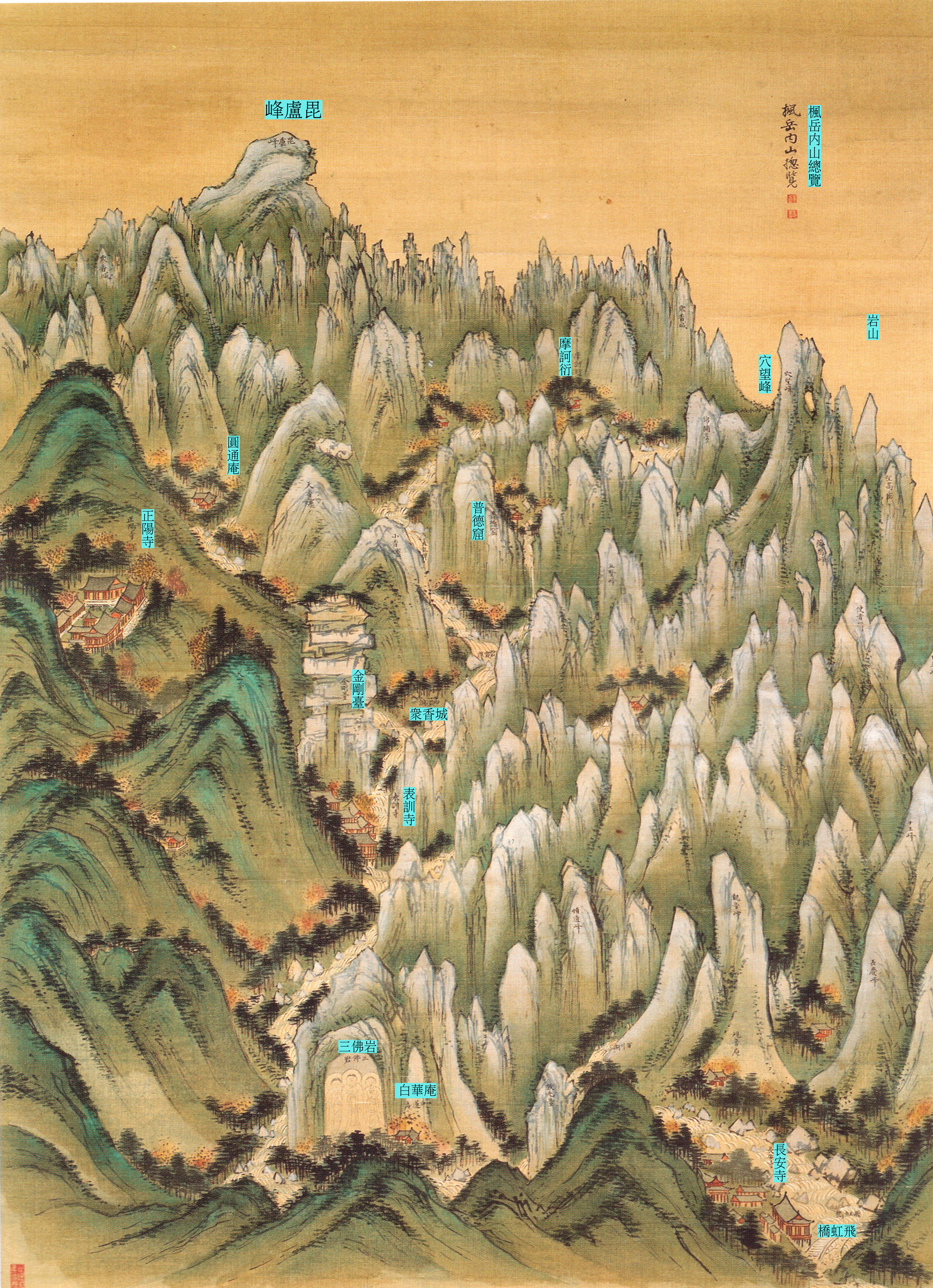
places named in the painting (full picture is 5810px × 8017px)

== See also ==
- Korean art
- Jeong Seon

== Sources ==
1. Gang Gwansik 강관식 (December 2006). "謙齋 鄭敾의 天文學 兼敎授 出仕와 <金剛全圖>의 天文易學的 解釋" [A Study on the duties of Gyeomje Jeong Seon (謙齋 鄭敾, 1676–1759) as extraordinary Professor in Astronomy and the Interpretation of the <General View of Geumgang Mountain 金剛全圖> from the Viewpoint of the Science of Astronomy-Divination(天文易學)]. 미술사학, Misulsahakbo, Reviews on Art History. 27: 137–194.
2. KAA. "Korean Genre Painting" (PDF). The International Journal of Korean Art and Archaeology. 3. National Museum of Korea. 2009. ISSN 2005-1115. Archived from the original (PDF) on 2014-12-13. original seems dead
3. MET. Yi Song-mi (1998). "Artistic Tradition and the Depiction of Reality: True-View Landscape Painting of the Joseon Dynasty". In Judith G. Smith (ed.). Arts_of_Korea. Metropolitan Museum of Art, New York. pp. 330–365 and 464–466. ISBN 9780300085785.
  catalog of the June 5, 1998—Jan. 24, 1999 exhibition. (fully available online as PDF).
4. Gansong Museum. "겸재정선 화첩 등 간송미술관 '걸작품' 7점 보물된다" [Masterpieces at the Gansong Museum of Art, including Gyeomjae Jeong Seon's paintings]. Gansong Museum of Art. 2017.
