= Singyo =

Singyo may refer to:

- Korean shamanism, also known as Singyo ("religion of deities")
- Singyo-dong, neighborhood in Jongno-gu, Seoul, South Korea
