= Inwang jesaekdo =

1751 painting by Jeong Seon

Clearing After Rain in Mt.Inwangsan or After Rain at Mt. Inwang
- Inwangjesaekdo (Korean)
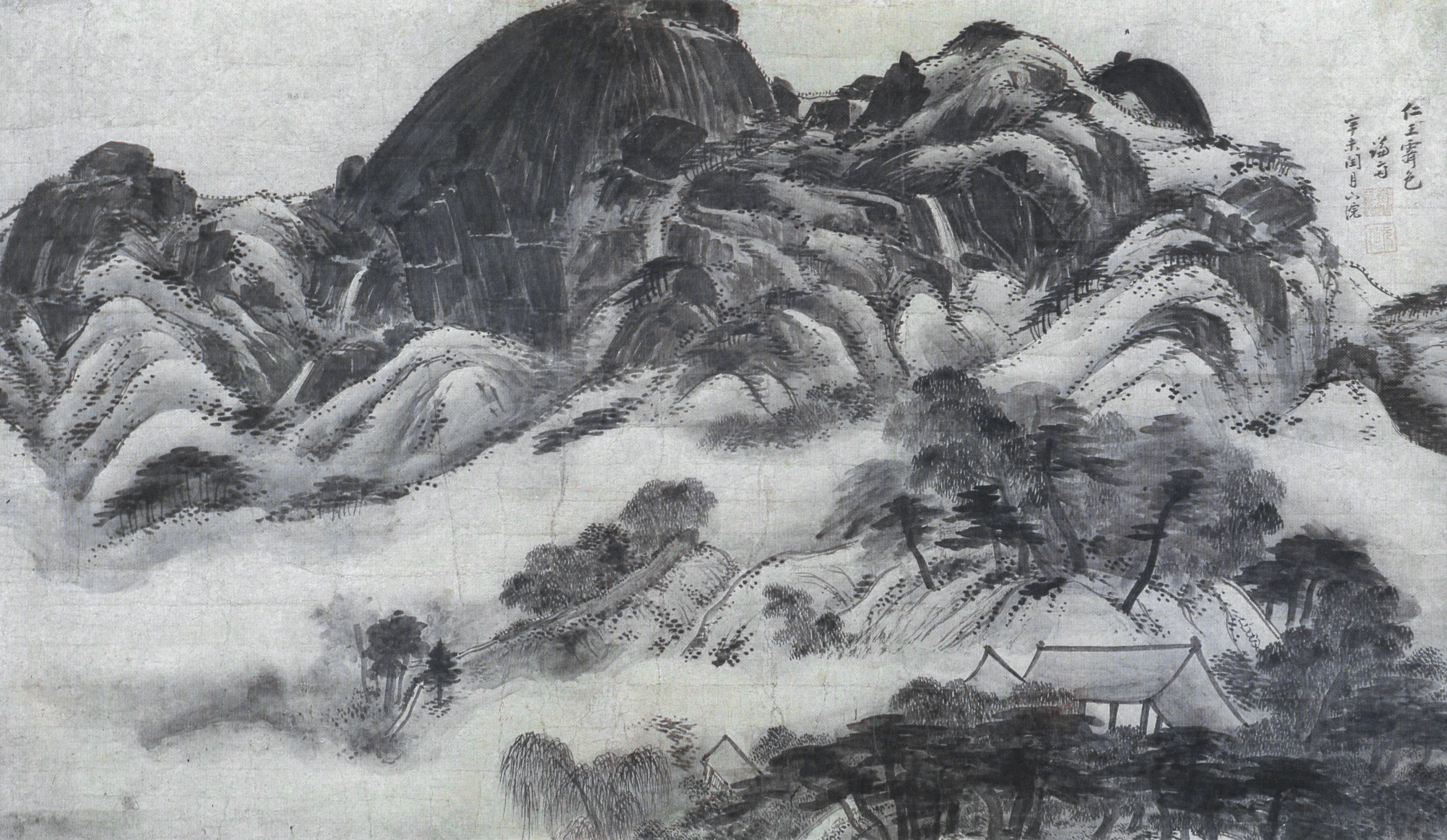
- Artist: Jeong Seon
- Year: 1751
- Type: Ink on paper
- Dimensions: 79.2 cm × 138.2 cm (31.2 in × 54.4 in)
- Location: Hoam Art Museum

Inwangjesaekdo (Korean: 인왕제색도; Hanja: 仁王霽色圖; "Clearing After Rain in Mt. Inwangsan" or "After Rain at Mt. Inwang") is a landscape painting by the famous Jeong Seon. It was painted during the reign of Joseon Dynasty King Yeongjo in 1751, at his birthplace in Cheongun-dong at Jongno District, modern-day Seoul. It was designated by the South Korean government as the 216th National Treasure of Korea on August 6, 1984. The painting is currently held and managed by the Ho-Am Art Museum in Yongin, Gyeonggi Province. Previously in possession of Lee Kun-hee, it has been donated to the National Museum of Korea following his death in 2020

== See also ==
- Korean art
- National treasures of Korea
- National treasures of North Korea
- Geumgangjeondo
- Jeong Seon
