= Geumgang jeondo =

1734 landscape painting by Jeong Seon

General View of Mt. Geumgangsan or The Diamond Mountains
- Geumgang jeondo (금강전도 金剛全圖) (Korean)
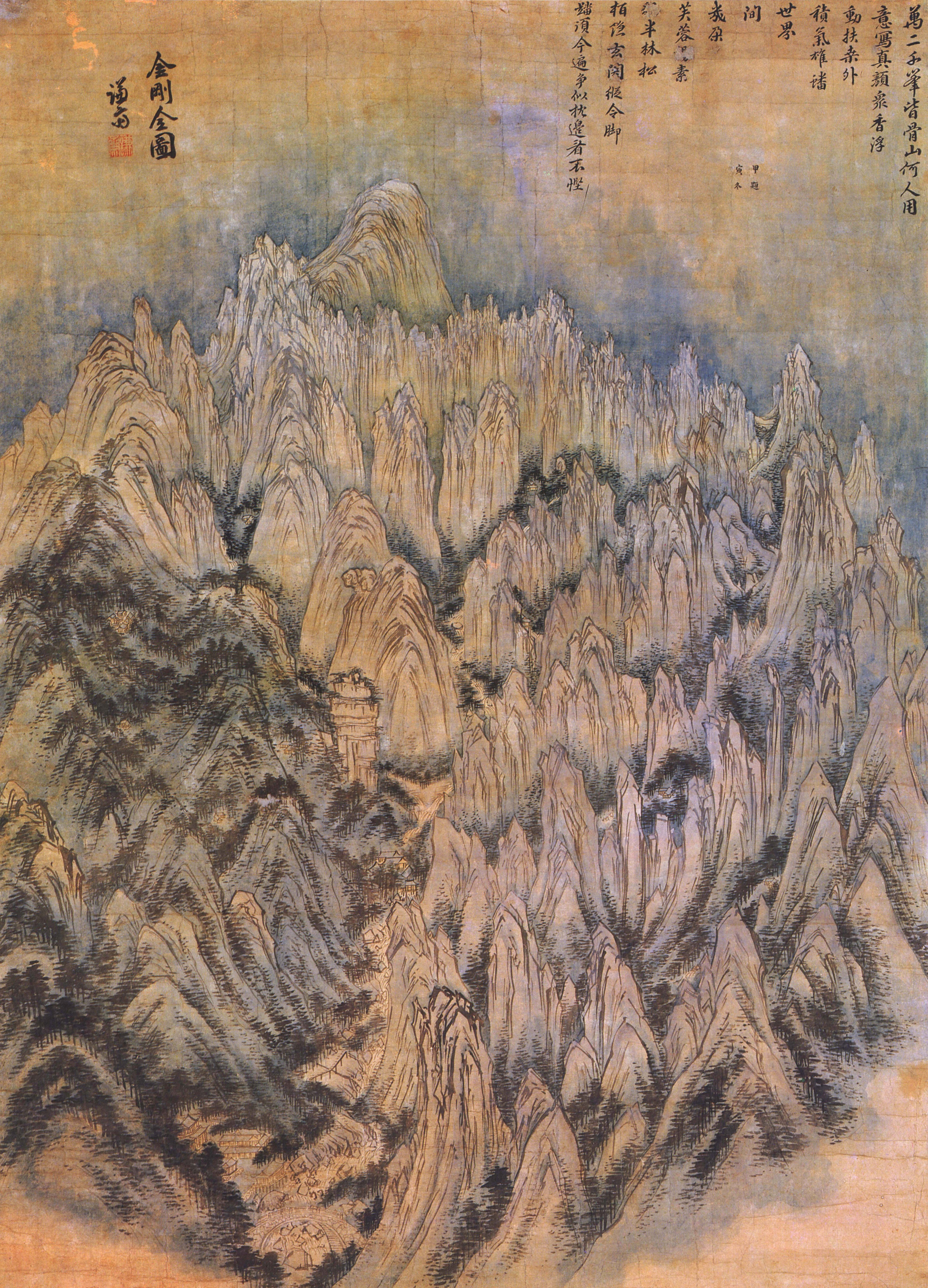
- Artist: Jeong Seon
- Year: 1734
- Type: Ink and light colors on paper
- Dimensions: 130.7 cm × 94.1 cm (51.5 in × 37.0 in)
- Location: Ho-Am Art Museum

Geumgang jeondo (Korean: 금강전도; Hanja: 金剛全圖) is a 1734 landscape painted by Jeong Seon. It was painted during the reign of King Yeongjo, and has since become famous. The title literally means "General view of Mt. Geumgangsan" or The Diamond Mountains). It was classified as the 217th National Treasure of South Korea on August 6, 1984. The painting is currently held and managed by the Ho-Am Art Museum in Yongin, Gyeonggi Province and is owned by Lee Kun-hee.

While many contemporaneous painters imitated the latest art trends from China, Jeong Seon ignored these to create unique themes based on Korean landscapes. His catalogue of paintings of Geumgansan made him famous and the preeminent painter of his time at the age of 37. He eventually painted around 100 images of the mountains which still exist to this day. The artist's love of the mountains influenced other artists to depict the Diamond Mountains and even encouraged mapmakers to make maps of the area.

Although Jeong Seon made many paintings of Mt. Geumgangsan, this painting is the largest and considered his best. Like many of his paintings, Jeong Seon painted this landscape while viewing the mountains. The painting is 130.7 centimeters in height and 94.1 centimeters in width. It is painted with India ink. The painting is of Naegeumgang, the Inner Mt. Geumgangsan. The painting depicts a total of twelve thousand peaks. The highest peak, Birobong, lies in the background and water flows from it toward a valley called Manpokdong which is divided from the left and right. The high sharp peaks are depicted by the artist with lines painted up and down while the artist used a dotting brush method to depict the earthen peaks, making them appear relatively soft and lush. This composition harmonizes the contrasting sharp edges of the rocky peaks with the softer earthen peaks.

== Pungsu interpretation ==
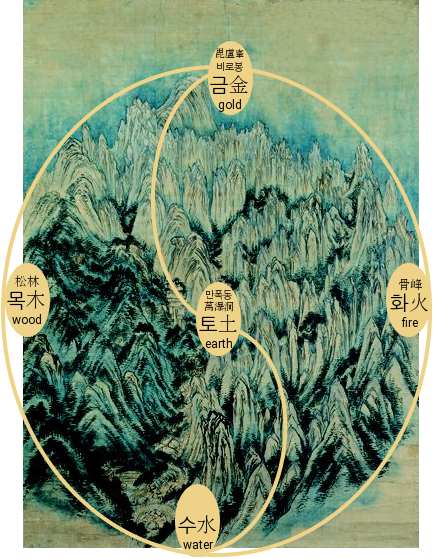
Discard title, poem, signature, etc.

Many philosophical interpretations have been given of this work. The names of Teacher Choi Oen-su(최왼수), Prof. Yu Jeon-yeong(유준영), and Prof. Oh Ju-seok(오주석) are coming to mind. From the synthesis provided by Pr Gang Gwansik(姜寬植), this painting encompasses the landscape in a circular form, creating a "Geumgang planet". To obtain this result, some elements were resized, displaced or even suppressed, as can be seen by comparing with other paintings by Jeong Seon, like the Geumgang in autumn.

--to be continued--

== Additional poem ==
The upper left corner of the work contains the title of the painting 金剛全圖 (Map of the Geumgang Mountain) as well as the signature and the stamp of the artist.

The upper right corner contains a set of 60 characters. The four central ones, 甲寅冬題, are making like an island and say "Gapin(1734) winter theme".

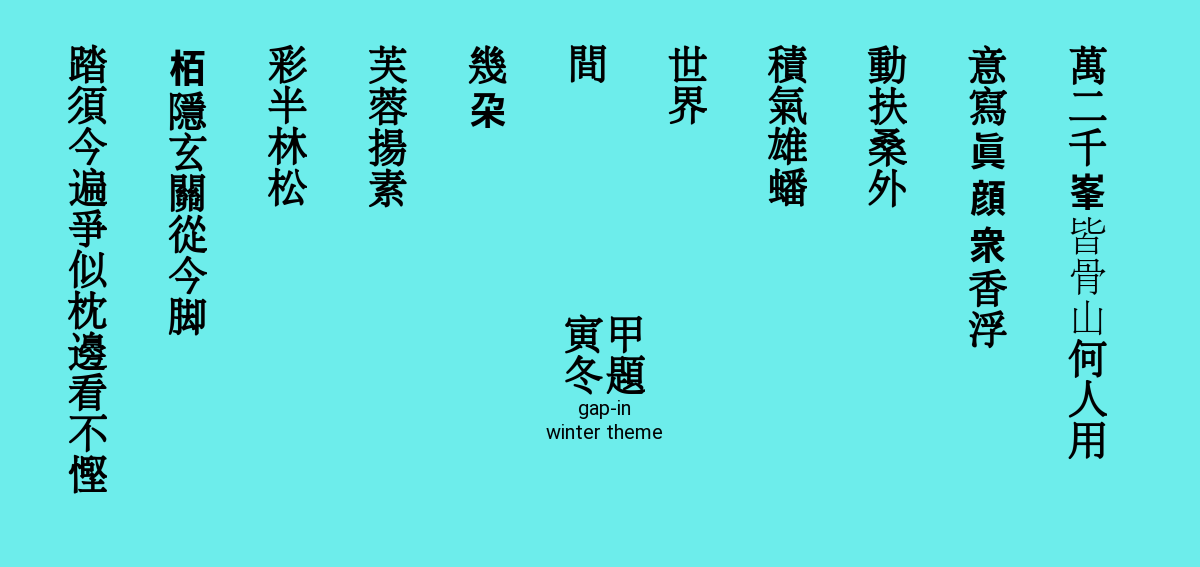
Pond shaped homage in the upper right corner

The 56 others are the 8 verses of a poem,

萬二千峯皆骨山 - 만이천봉개골산
何人用意寫眞顔 - 하인용의사진안
衆香浮動扶桑外 - 중향부동부상외
積氣雄蟠世界間 - 적기웅반세계간
幾朶芙蓉揚素彩 - 기타부용양소채
半林松栢隱玄關 - 반림송백은현관
從今脚踏須今遍 - 종금각답수금편
爭似枕邊看不慳 - 쟁사침변간불간

and seem to draw the banks of a pond around the island.

This inscription has been used to date the painting to winter 1734, when Jeong Seon was 59 years old. (1734 was the only gap-in year during Jeong Seon's life). But a more precise analysis undertaken by Gang Gwan-sik has shown that this 60 characters inscription has not been written by Jeong Seon. The brush strokes are not the same. Moreover, the painting uses Mt. Geumgang (金剛), the spring name of Mt. Diamond, for its title, while the poem uses Mt. Gaegol (皆骨), the winter name of the mountain. A better evaluation of the poem is to consider it as an homage written in winter 1794 (another gap-in year) by the custodian of the work. Far being from describing a paint from view process, the poem ends by saying:

"Even if you visit the mountain yourself and tread on its every nook and cranny, how can your joy be compared with what you feel upon viewing this picture from your bedside?"

== See also ==
- Korean art
- National treasures of Korea
- Inwangjesaekdo
- Jeong Seon

== Sources ==
1. 강관식 (Gang Gwansik) (December 2006). "謙齋 鄭敾의 天文學 兼敎授 出仕와 <金剛全圖>의 天文易學的 解釋" [A Study on the duties of Gyeomje Jeong Seon (謙齋 鄭敾, 1676–1759) as extraordinary Professor in Astronomy and the Interpretation of the <General View of Geumgang Mountain 金剛全圖> from the Viewpoint of the Science of Astronomy-Divination(天文易學)]. 미술사학, Misulsahakbo, Reviews on Art History. 27: 137–194.
2. KAA "Korean Genre Painting" (PDF). The International Journal of Korean Art and Archaeology. 3. National Museum of Korea. 2009. ISSN 2005-1115. Archived from the original (PDF) on 2014-12-13. original seems dead
