= Singyo-dong =

- Interactive map of Singyo-dong
- Country: South Korea

Area
  - Total: 0.10 km^{2} (0.039 sq mi)

Korean name
- Hangul: 신교동
- Hanja: 新橋洞
- RR: Singyo-dong
- MR: Sin'gyo-dong

Singyo-dong (Korean: 신교동) is a dong (neighbourhood) of Jongno District, Seoul, South Korea. It is a legal dong (법정동 法定洞) administered under its administrative dong (행정동 行政洞), Cheongun-dong.

== See also ==
- Administrative divisions of South Korea
