= Mount Kumgang =

Mountain range in North Korea

Coordinates: 38°39′24″N 128°06′18″E

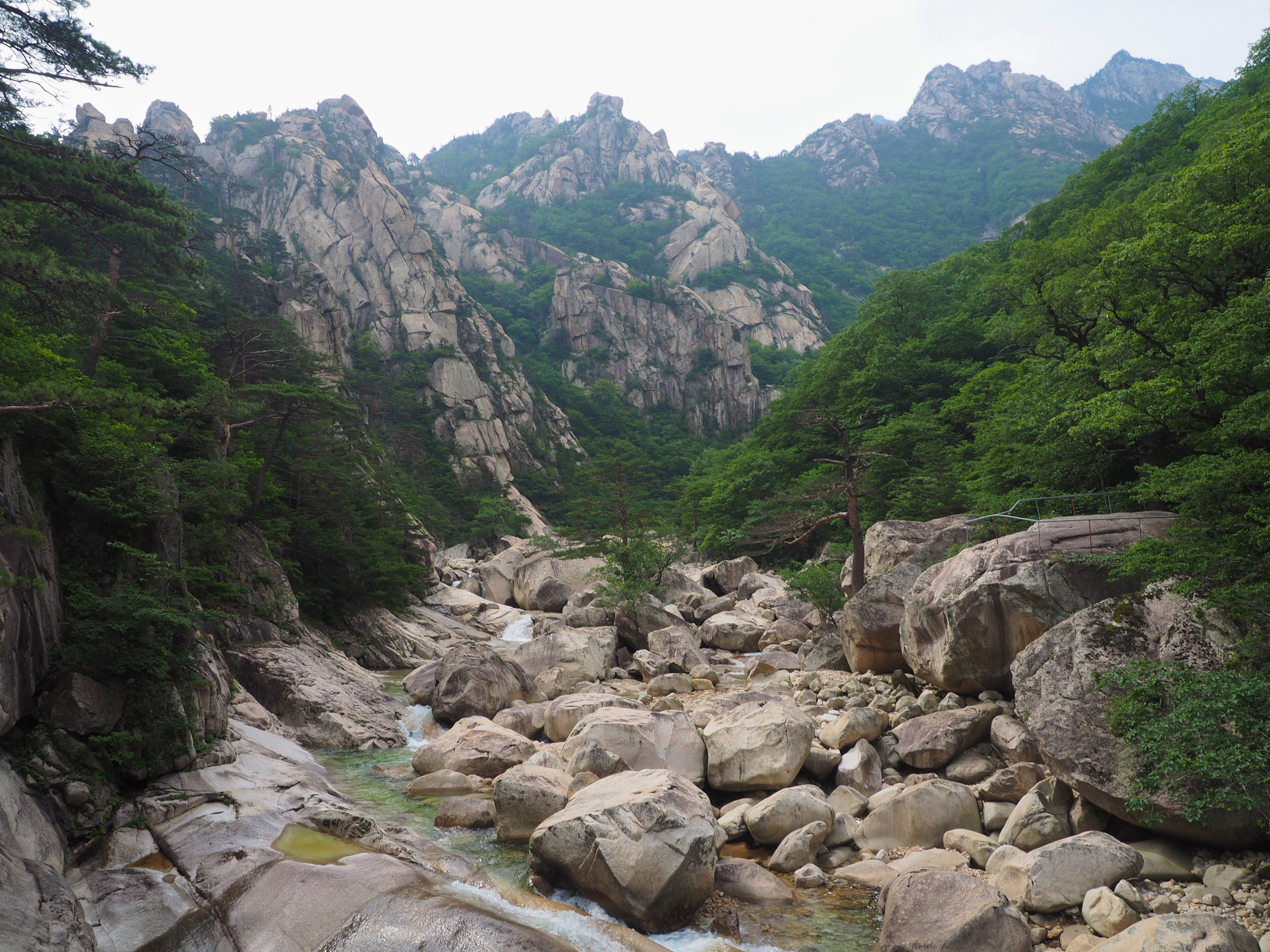

Highest point
- Elevation: 1,638 m (5,374 ft)
- Prominence: 1,111 m (3,645 ft)
- Listing: Ribu

Geography
- Location: Kangwŏn Province, North Korea

UNESCO World Heritage Site
- Part of: Mount Kumgang – Diamond Mountain from the Sea
- Criteria: Mixed: iii, vii
- Reference: 1642-001
- Inscription: 2025 (47th Session)

Korean name
- Hangul: 금강산
- Hanja: 金剛山
- Lit.: diamond mountain
- RR: Geumgangsan
- MR: Kŭmgangsan
- IPA: [kɯmɡaŋsʰan]

Mount Kumgang (Korean: 금강산; lit. 'Diamond Mountain') or the Kumgang Mountains is a mountain massif, with a 1,638-metre-high (5,374 ft) peak, in Kangwŏn Province, North Korea. It is located on the east coast of the country, in an area of Kangwŏn Province formerly known as the Mount Kumgang Tourist Region, and is part of the Taebaek mountain range which runs along the east of the Korean Peninsula. The mountain is about 50 kilometres (31 mi) from the South Korean city of Sokcho in Gangwon Province. In 2025, it was designated a UNESCO World Heritage Site.

== Seasonal names ==
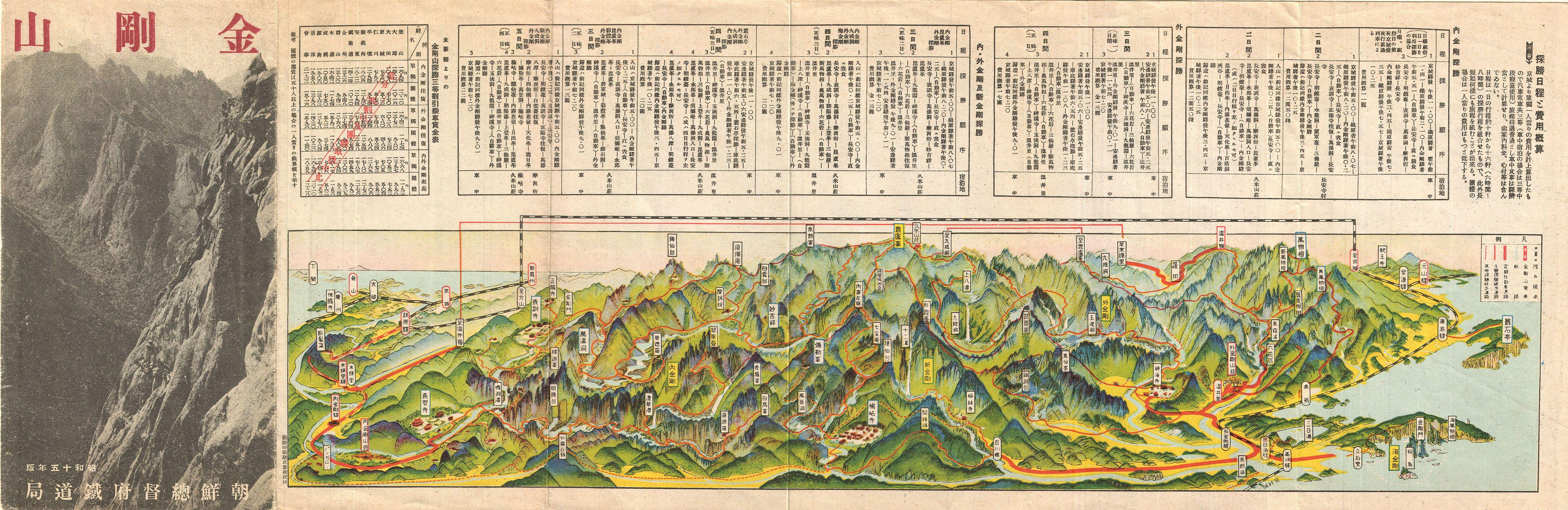
Japanese map of Kongō-san, or Mount Kumgang in 1939.

Mount Kumgang has been known for its scenic beauty since ancient times and is the subject of many different works of art. Including its spring name, Kŭmgangsan (금강산; 金剛山; [kɯmɡaŋsʰan]), it has many different names for each season, but it is most widely known today in the Korean language as Kŭmgangsan. In summer, it is called Pongraesan (봉래산; 蓬萊山; lit. 'Penglai Mountain'); in autumn, Phung'aksan (풍악산; 楓岳山; 楓骨山; lit. 'great mountain of colored leaves'); in winter, Kaegolsan (개골산; 皆骨山; lit. 'all bone mountain').

== Formation ==
The creation of Mt. Kŭmgang is closely related to the unique climate and distinctive geological activity of the area. Mt. Kŭmgang is a region where rain and snow fall relatively heavily, and the climate varies depending on altitude and even east-west location. The Kŭmgang geological layer is composed of several types of rocks from ancient geological periods. The most widely distributed rocks are granites of two types (mica mixed and stained), with granite-gneissic fertilization zones being formed in some areas. The rocks are transversely oriented and form a joint in various directions, forming unusual terrains and strange rocks, which have been formed as a result of erosion for a long period of crustal activity and weathering, from 10 million years to the present.

== Geography ==
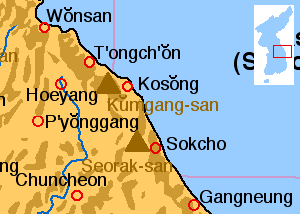
Location of Mount Kumgang in eastern Korea

Kŭmgang Mountain ranges from Tongchon County, Kangwon Province in North Korea, to Inje County, Gangwon Province, South Korea. The area is up to 40 km long east–west, 60 km north–south, with a total size of 530 km² to the back of Baekdudaegan. It is divided between the "Inner Kumgang" in the west and the "Outer Kumgang" in the east. The area on the east side of the Yeongeum River is called "Hae Kumgang" ("Sea Kumgang"). The main peak of Mt. Kŭmgang is Pirobong, and there are more than 60 peaks over 1,000 meters. Combined with countless sub-peaks, they were historically called "12,000 peaks". Many scenic spots in the area are designated as natural monuments of North Korea. The southern part of the "Outer Kumgang" is also called "New Kumgang". There are 11 areas in Outer Kumgang, 8 in Inner Kumgang and 3 in Hae Kumgang, although not all have been opened.

=== Inner Kumgang ===
Since ancient times, the name Kumgang has been mainly used for the "Inner Kumgang" (내금강), which, located in the western part of the central pole, contains the main peak of Mount Kŭmgang.

=== Outer Kumgang ===
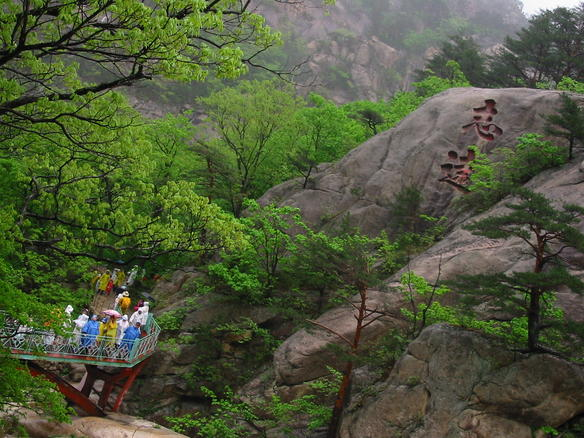
The path to Kuryoung Falls

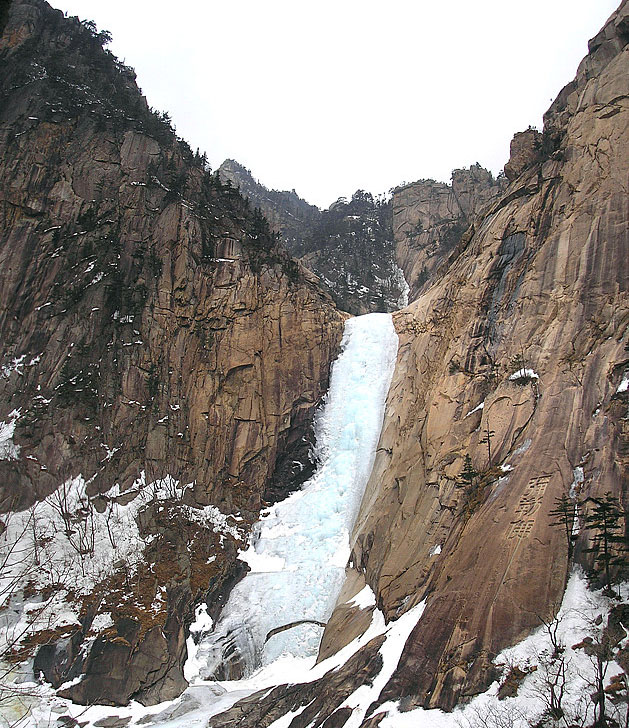
Kuryong Falls

"Outer Kumgang" (외금강) is located to the east of the "Inner kumgang" and covers an area along the east coast. The Outer Kŭmgang area is noted for the large number of peaks. Chipson Peak (literally "rock of ten thousand forms") is known for its many waterfalls. It includes many mountain peaks including Moonjoo Peak, Ho Peak, Sangdeung Peak, etc. The "Sea Kŭmgang" area is known for the lagoons and stone pillars.

Kuryong Falls ("Nine Dragons Falls") in Kuryongyeon is one of the three major waterfalls in Korea along with Daeseung Falls in Seoraksan. It is 74 meters in height and 4 meters in width. The waterfall cliffs and the bottom are made of one granite mass. Bibbong Waterfall is 139 meters higher, and is named for its refreshing water stream. The rocks there are associated with unique legends.

=== Environment ===
Much of the mountain is covered by mixed broadleaf and coniferous forest and protected in a 60,000 ha national park. Some 25,000 ha has been identified by BirdLife International as an Important Bird Area (IBA) because it supports endangered red-crowned cranes.

== Climate ==
It belongs to the alpine region and has relatively high rainfall, with heavy rainfall in July and August. The East-West difference is severe, and the rainfall increases from Haegeumgang to Oegeumgang, but due to the phenomenon of Foehn, the rainfall decreases from Naegeumgang to Naegeumgang. It is also warm and humid in preparation for the overall climate in Korea. However, depending on the altitude, cold temperatures of minus 10 to 30 degrees Celsius will continue in the winter, and depending on the region, snow will fall as early as October. These climatic conditions lie at the intersection of the northern and southern plants.

== Mount Kumgang Tourist Region ==
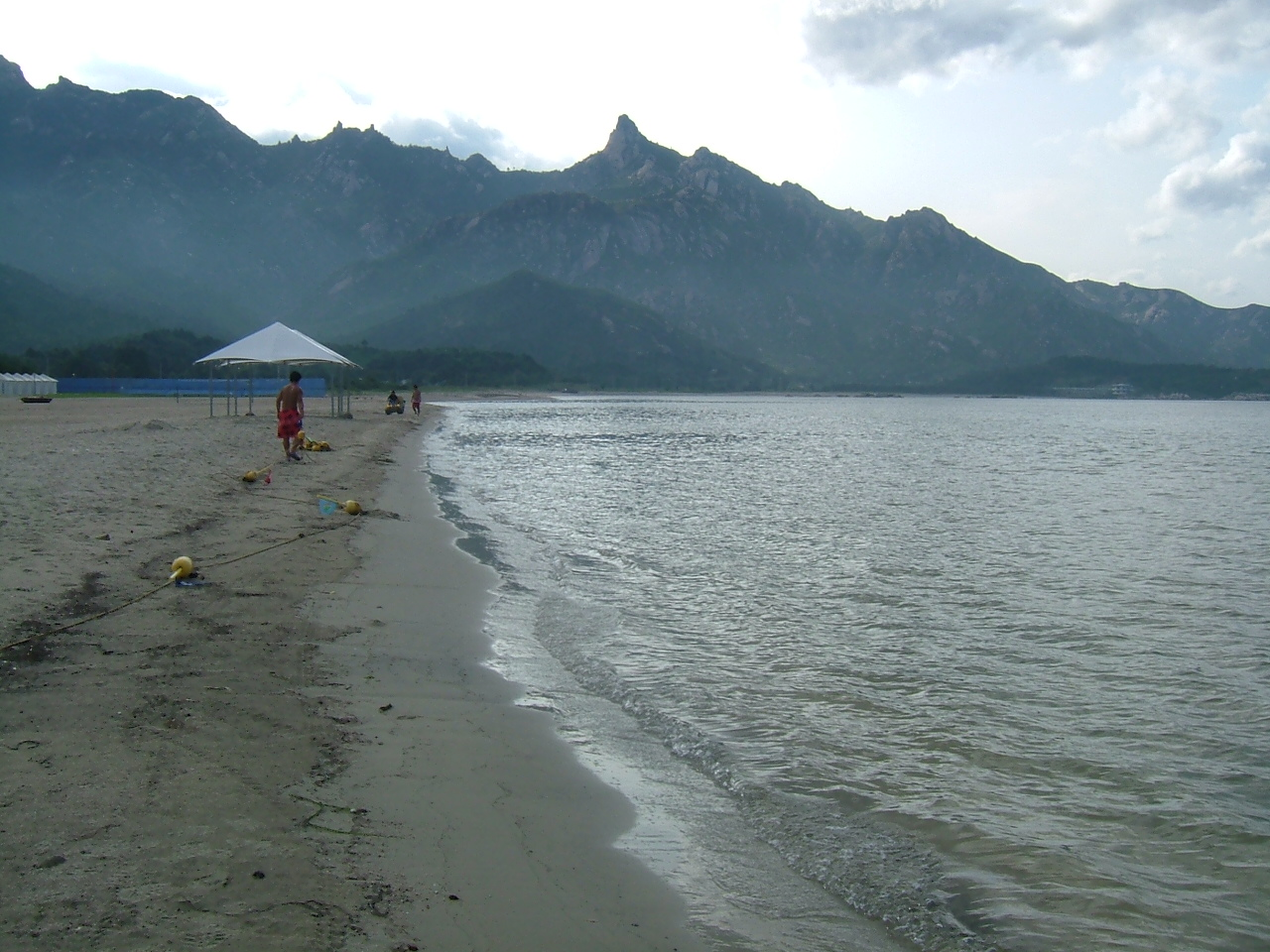
Mount Kumgang from the coast

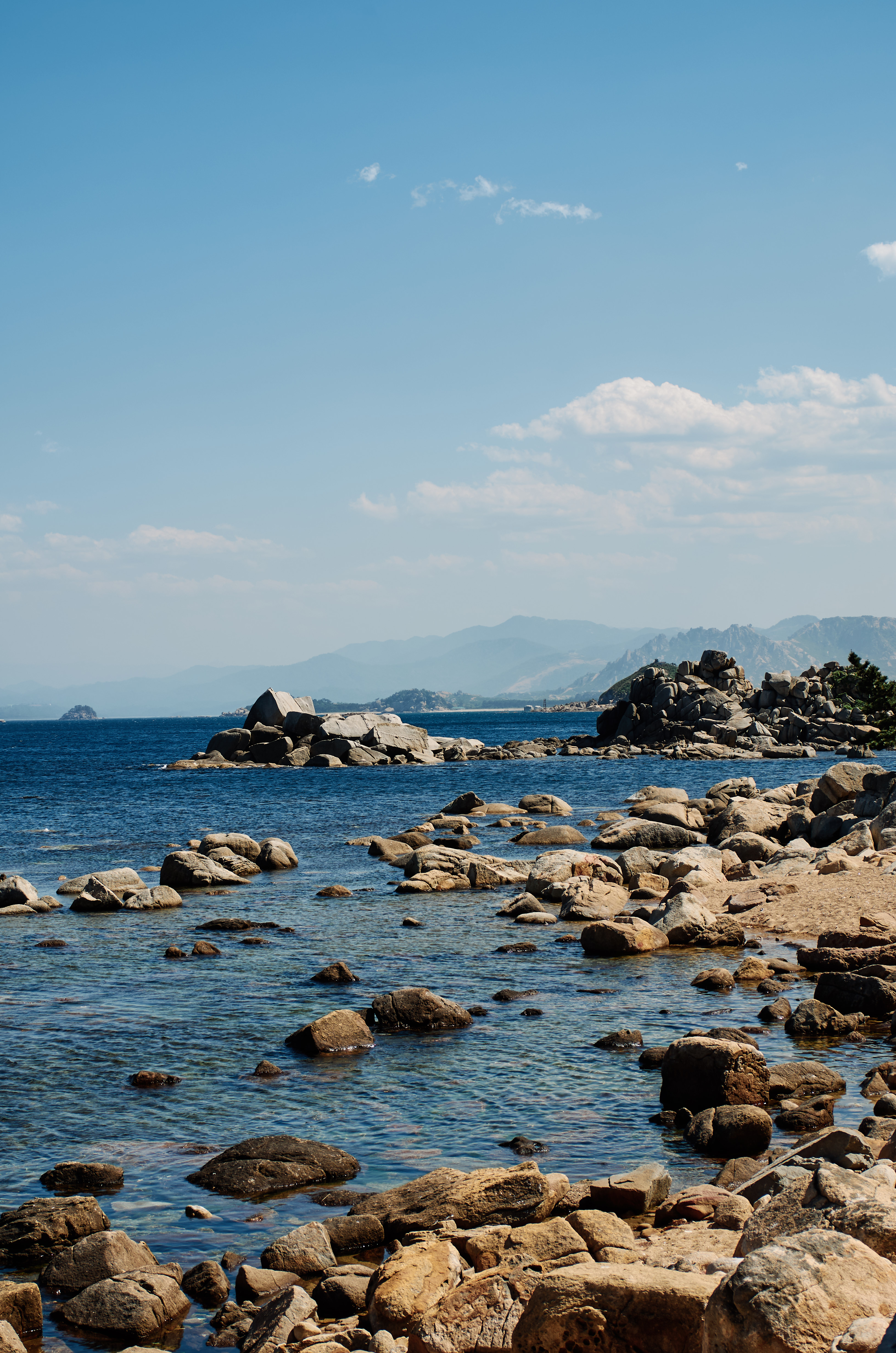
Sea Kumgang

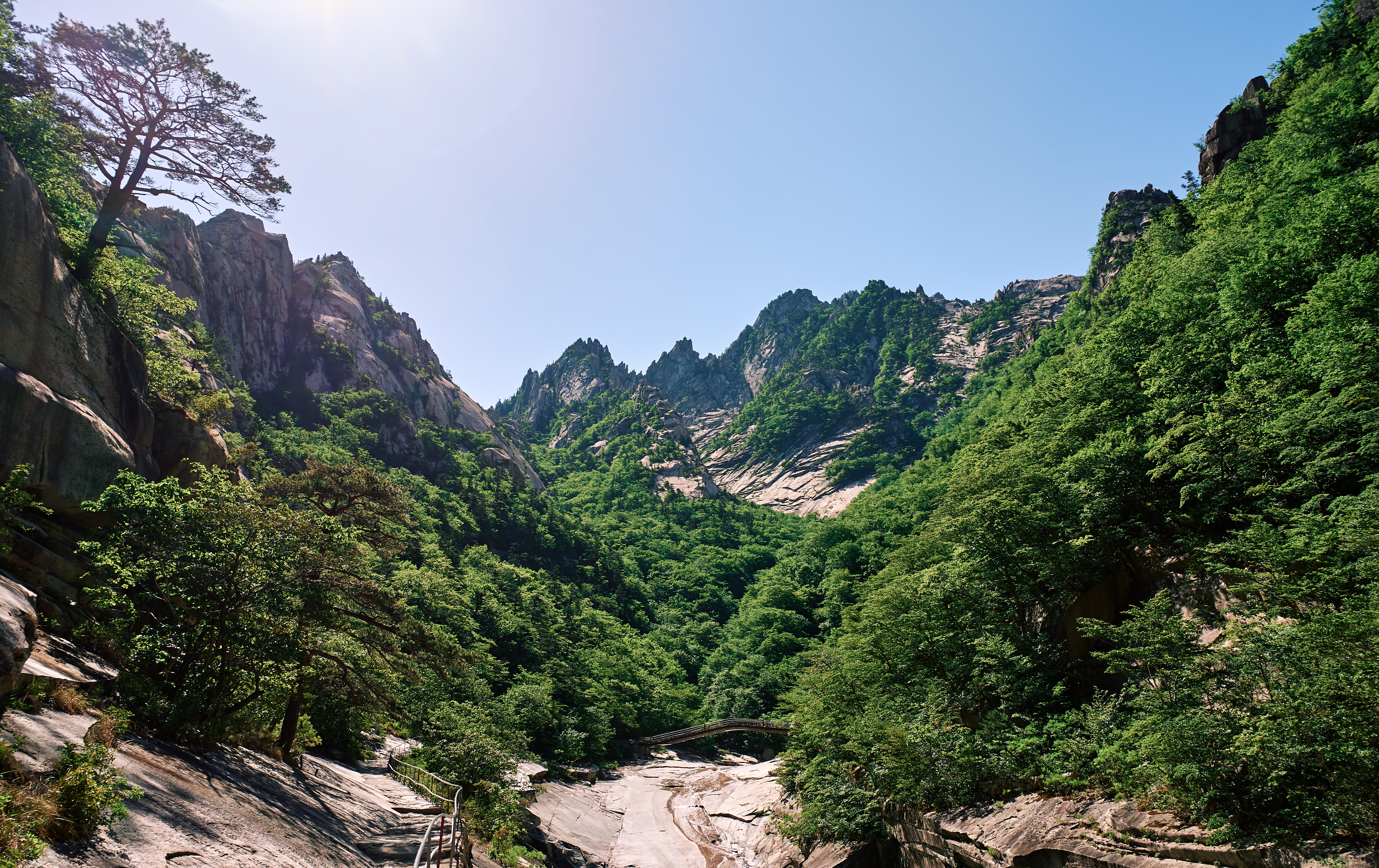
Mount Kumgang

Starting in 1998, South Korean tourists were allowed to visit Mount Kumgang, initially travelling by cruise ship, and later more commonly by coach. In 2002, the area around the mountain was separated from Kangwŏn Province and organized as a separately-administered Tourist Region. The land route was opened in 2003. A rail link exists on the North Korean side up to the border, but no tracks are laid between Gangneung and the border in South Korea.

In 1998, there were 15,500 tourists in November and December, in 1999 there were 148,000, and in 2000 213,000. In 2001 tourist numbers dropped to 58,000 amidst disagreements over the access over land. As of 2002, almost 500,000 had visited the Mount Kumgang Tourist Region. Tourist numbers then reached about 240,000 a year. In June 2005, Hyundai Asan announced the one millionth South Korean visit to the area.

The Mount Kumgang Tourist Region, developed by Hyundai Asan, was thought to be one way for the North Korean government to earn hard currency. The currency at the resort was neither the South Korean won nor the North Korean won, but the Chinese RMB and US dollar. Food and services to South Korean tourists were provided by some North Koreans. But most of the staff in the hotels are Chinese citizens of Korean heritage with Korean language skills. There had been plans to expand the site but as of late 2022 there were reports based on satellite imagery that the resort's facilities, including a golf course and a floating hotel, were being dismantled pursuant to directives from leader Kim Jong Un.

On the morning of July 11, 2008, a 53-year-old South-Korean tourist was shot and killed while walking on the resort's beach. Park Wang-ja entered a military area by crossing over a sand dune and was shot twice by North Korean soldiers. North Korea claimed that sentries had no choice but to shoot her because, despite their order to stop, she fled. South Korea demanded an on-the-spot survey, but North Korea declined it, claiming all the facts were clear and all responsibilities were the victim's and South Korea's. Due to the shooting, South Korea temporarily suspended all trips to Mount Kumgang.

In March 2010, the DPRK government warned of "extraordinary measures" if the tourism ban were not lifted. On April 23, 2010, the North Korean government seized 5 properties owned by South Korea at the resort, saying that it was done "in compensation for the damage the North side suffered due to the suspension of the tour for a long period." In seizing the properties, North Korea also alluded to the Baengnyeong incident, showing displeasure with South Korea blaming North Korea for the sinking of the ship.

Since April 2010, North Korea is now permitting companies to run tours from the North Korean side, making it appear increasingly unlikely that tours will be resumed from the South. However, on October 1, 2010, news reports said, "Red Cross officials from the two Koreas agreed Friday to hold reunions for families separated by the Korean War amid mixed signals from North Korea on easing tensions over the sinking of a South Korean warship. One hundred families from each country will attend the meetings from Oct. 30 to Nov. 5 at a hotel and reunion center at the North's scenic Diamond Mountain resort, Unification Ministry spokeswoman Lee Jong-joo said."

As of September 2011, North Korea has begun operating cruises directly from Rason in north-eastern North Korea, to the port in Mount Kumgang, offering visitors the chance to stay in the resorts previously run by the south. Although they are aimed primarily at Chinese guests, western companies are also offering the tours.

On January 15, 2024, it was announced that North Korea would close the Mount Kumgang International Tourism Administration.

== Cultural significance ==
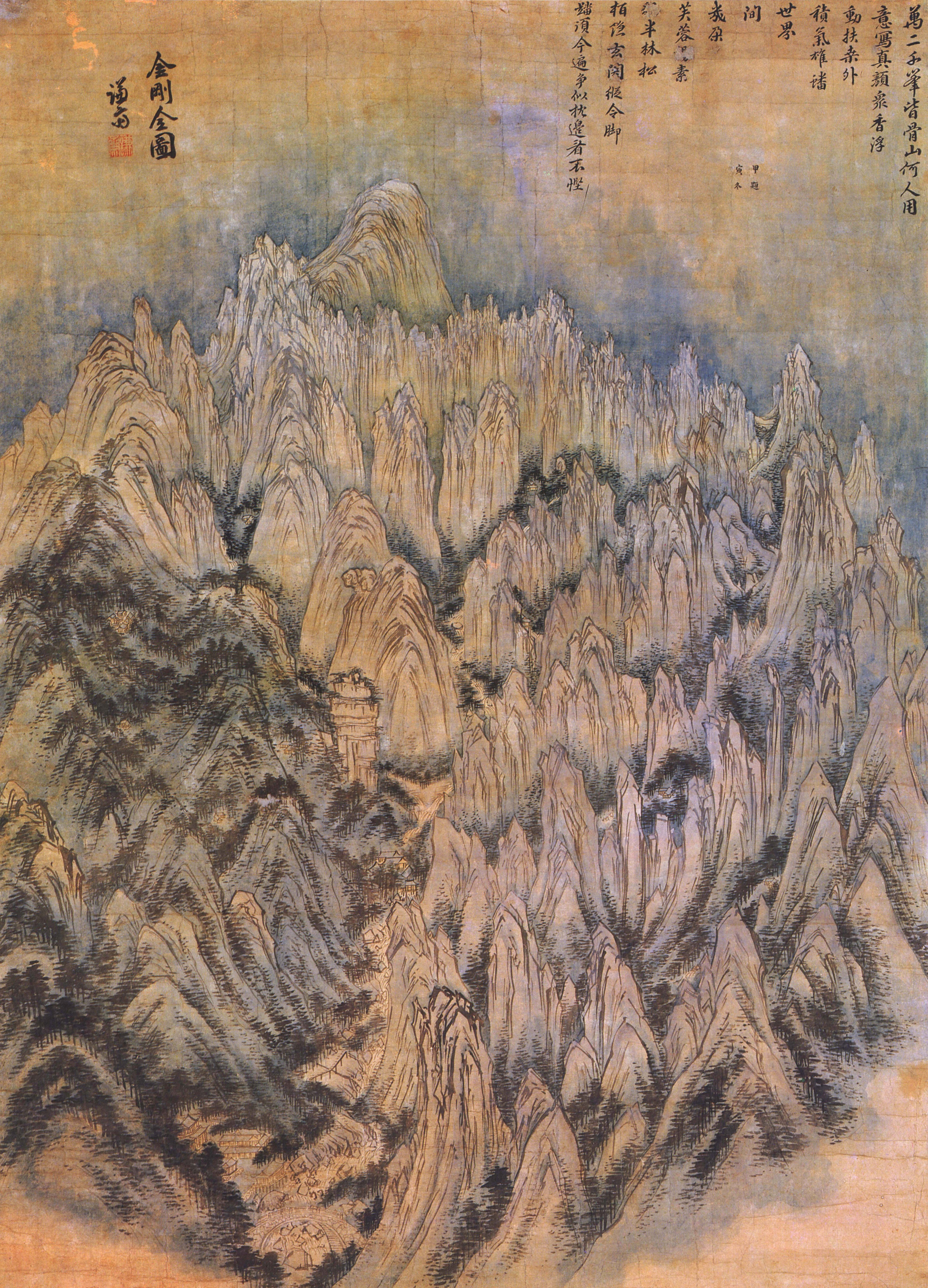
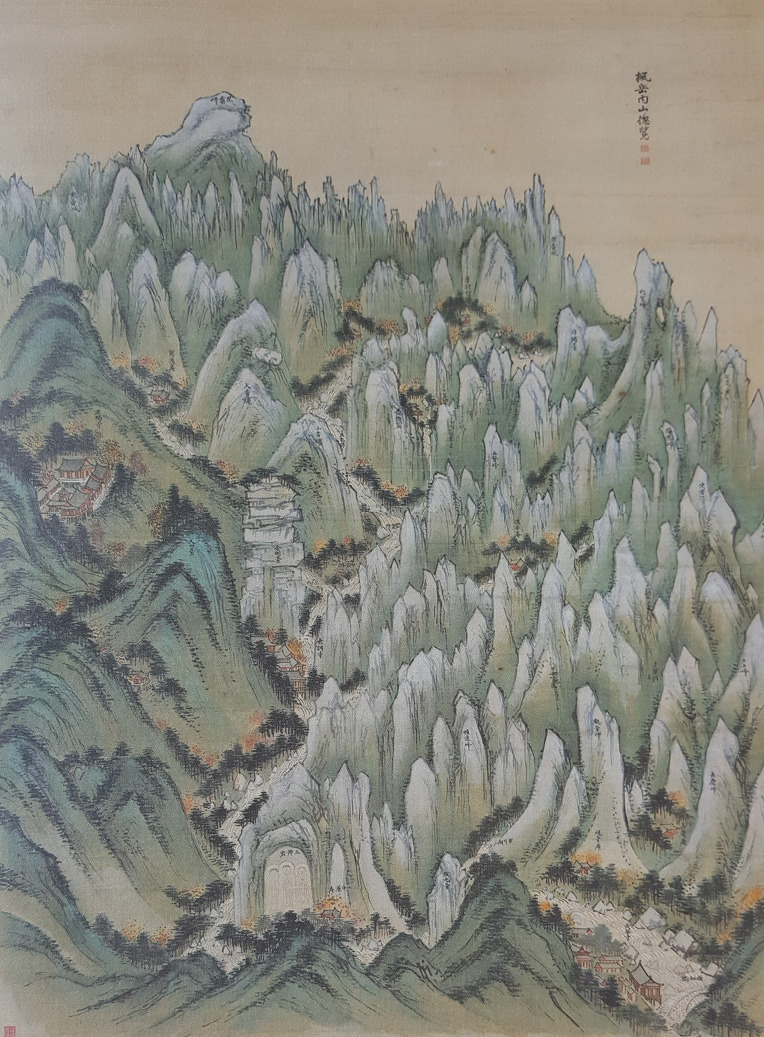
Spring view, Autumn view by Jeong Seon

Various Korean artists have revered Kŭmgangsan as a subject for art and poetry since antiquity. Numerous poets and artists who lived during the Joseon period (1392–1910) made pilgrimages to Kŭmgangsan. Among other well-known works are the Geumgang jeondo and the Pungaknaesan chongramdo, painted in the 1740s by Jeong Seon.

The division of the Korean peninsula in 1950 resulted in the South Korean people finding themselves unable to visit this beloved mountain for the better part of 50 years. The 155-mile-long (249 km) barbed-wire fence erected as part of the DMZ (Demilitarized zone) separating the two Koreas proved to be an obstacle stronger than any other barrier.

In 1894 the British writer Isabella Bird Bishop referred to it in her travelogue as "Diamond Mountain".

Kŭmgangsan is the subject of a 1962 South Korean folk song, Longing for Mt. Geumgang. It is also the setting of the 1973 North Korean revolutionary opera The Song of Mount Kumgang, and is a central motif in the South Korea TV drama Saimdang, Memoir of Colors.

In 2025, Kŭmgangsan was designated as a World Heritage Site by UNESCO.

== See also ==
- Mount Kumgang Tourist Region
- List of mountains in Korea
- Geography of North Korea
- The Heavenly Maiden and the Woodcutter (Korean folktale)
