= Jeon Hyeong-pil =

Korean art collector (1906–1962)

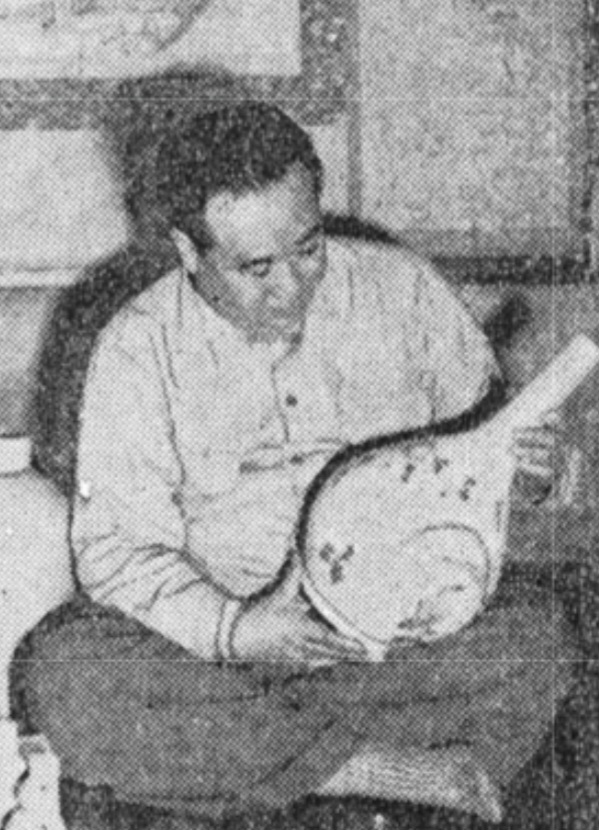

Korean name
- Hangul: 전형필
- Hanja: 全鎣弼
- RR: Jeon Hyeongpil
- MR: Chŏn Hyŏngp'il

Art name
- Hangul: 간송, 지산, 취설재
- Hanja: 澗松, 芝山, 翠雪齋
- RR: Gansong, Jisan, Chwiseoljae
- MR: Kansong, Chisan, Ch'wisŏlchae

Courtesy name
- Hangul: 천뢰
- Hanja: 天賚
- RR: Cheonroe
- MR: Ch'ŏlloe

Jeon Hyeong-pil (Korean: 전형필; July 29, 1906 – January 26, 1962) was a Korean art collector. He is also known by his art name Gansong.

He is famous for his great achievement to collect 12 national treasures, 10 treasures and 4 cultural assets designated by Seoul metropolitan government. He strove to bring back Korean cultural assets and heritage from Japan, where a great deal of Korean antiquities were taken during the Japanese colonial period. The first private art museum was built in 1938 named Bohwagak (보화각) and later took care of most of valuable Korean antiquities during Korean War. After his death in 1962, the name Bohwagak was changed into Gansong Art Museum which only opens twice in a year since 1971.

== Lifetime ==
He was born into a wealthy family in 1906. In 1926, he graduated from Whimoon High School and then went to Law department of Waseda University. His father was able to possess a great fortune by expanding his shops along Jongno street, current central area of Seoul.

In 1932, he overtook his work to collect Korean antiquities at own expense to protect Korean art and culture. His top priority was to preserve Korean artifacts during Japanese rule. It is said that an independent activist Go Hui-dong and O se-chang influenced Jeon's philosophy and philanthropic passion for Korean arts.

For achieving his own ambition, he established an art institute, Bukdanjang(북단장, 北壇莊) to research the value of priceless treasures and antiquities and built Bohwagak building, the first private art museum of Korea in the existing institute at his age of 32(1938).

In 1940, he was seated as a principal of Boseong high school currently in Songpa district of Seoul and later organized the group Dongin, the first Korean association on art history. Art history association of Korea has been rooted in this organization.

In 1962, he was posthumously honored to the cultural medals by South Korean government. Bohwagak was later transformed to The institute of Korean ethnic art to study and research collections of Mr. Jeon in 1966, which later became reopened under the name of Kansong Art Museum since 1971.

== Gansong Art Museum ==
The museum holds the largest numbers of National Treasures of South Korea. It notably holds an original 1446 copy of the text Hunminjeongeum, which proposes what is now the Korean alphabet Hangul. This copy is National Treasure No. 70. The museum only opens in May and October.

=== Hunminjeongeum ===
In 1940, the genuine copy of Hunminjeongeum was found in Andong City, which had been the heirloom of House of Kim. It was said that King Sejong bestowed the copy with the House to praise the defeat of the conquest of Jurchen people in northern part of Korean peninsula.

After hearing the news that the document was found, Jeon paid 10,000 won as worth as ten enormous residences in major cities at the time. However, he feared the fact that Japanese authorities were eager to suppress the education of Hangul during the late 1930s given that ordinary Koreans had not been able to use Korean names at this time. Therefore, Jeon made Hunminjeongeum public after the independence of South Korea.

=== Goryeo porcelain ===
Goryeo porcelain is said to be one of the most valuable cultural assets of Korea during the reign of Goryeo since the 12th century. However, a great deal of porcelains were easy to be brought abroad without specific control on assets. In this regard, Jeon tried to find out some pieces which had been brought out of Korean peninsula. From his own work through the institute, a British lawyer got on the list. It was John Gatsby who possessed twenty two pieces of Goryeo porcelains at the moment. In fact, the deal was beyond reach since the price of the twenty two was more expensive than 400,000 won which Jeon suggested. In the meantime, John finally agreed to give twenty pieces back to the homeland after finding out Jeon's work to save Korean artistic figure and kept two pieces himself.

=== Korean War ===
During Korean war, North Korean authorities harshly tried to steal all the assets of Gansong museum. From this kind of threat, he could not leave Seoul even for a while. The tactic brought his colleagues and friends to protect cultural relics amid the conflicts since the control over the capital area had gone through some changes. Jeon also didn't leave Seoul amid bombard.

== See also ==
- National treasures of Korea
- List of Korean painters
- Korean ceramics
- Shin Yun-bok
