= Annie Chun =

American entrepreneur

- Born: Seoul, South Korea
- Occupation: Entrepreneur
- Years active: 1991–present
- Known for: Founding Annie Chun's
- Children: 2

Annie Chun is an American entrepreneur. She is the founder of Annie Chun's, an Asian food brand that sold to CJ Foods in 2009, and gimMe Seaweed.

== Early life ==
Annie Chun was born and raised in central Seoul. In the late 1970s, Chun immigrated to San Francisco, where her family owned a Korean restaurant.

== Career ==
In 1991, Chun began selling homemade Asian-inspired sauces at farmers' markets in Marin County. In 1992, she founded Annie Chun's Gourmet Foods with Stephen "Steve" Broad, her husband.

In 2005, CJ Foods, a subsidiary of CJ CheilJedang, acquired a 70% stake in Annie Chun's for US$6.1 million. Annie Chun's offers Asian-style food products, including noodles, soups, sauces and snacks.

In 2009, Annie Chun's was sold to CJ Foods.

In 2012, Chun and Broad founded gimMe Health Foods, best known for the gimMe Seaweed product. As of May 2024, it is the top-selling seaweed snack on Amazon.

== Personal life ==
With Steve Broad, Chun has two children: one son and one daughter.

== Recognition ==
In 2024, Chun was included on Inc.'s Female Founders 250 list.
