= Byeong Sam Jeon =

South Korean artist (born 1977)

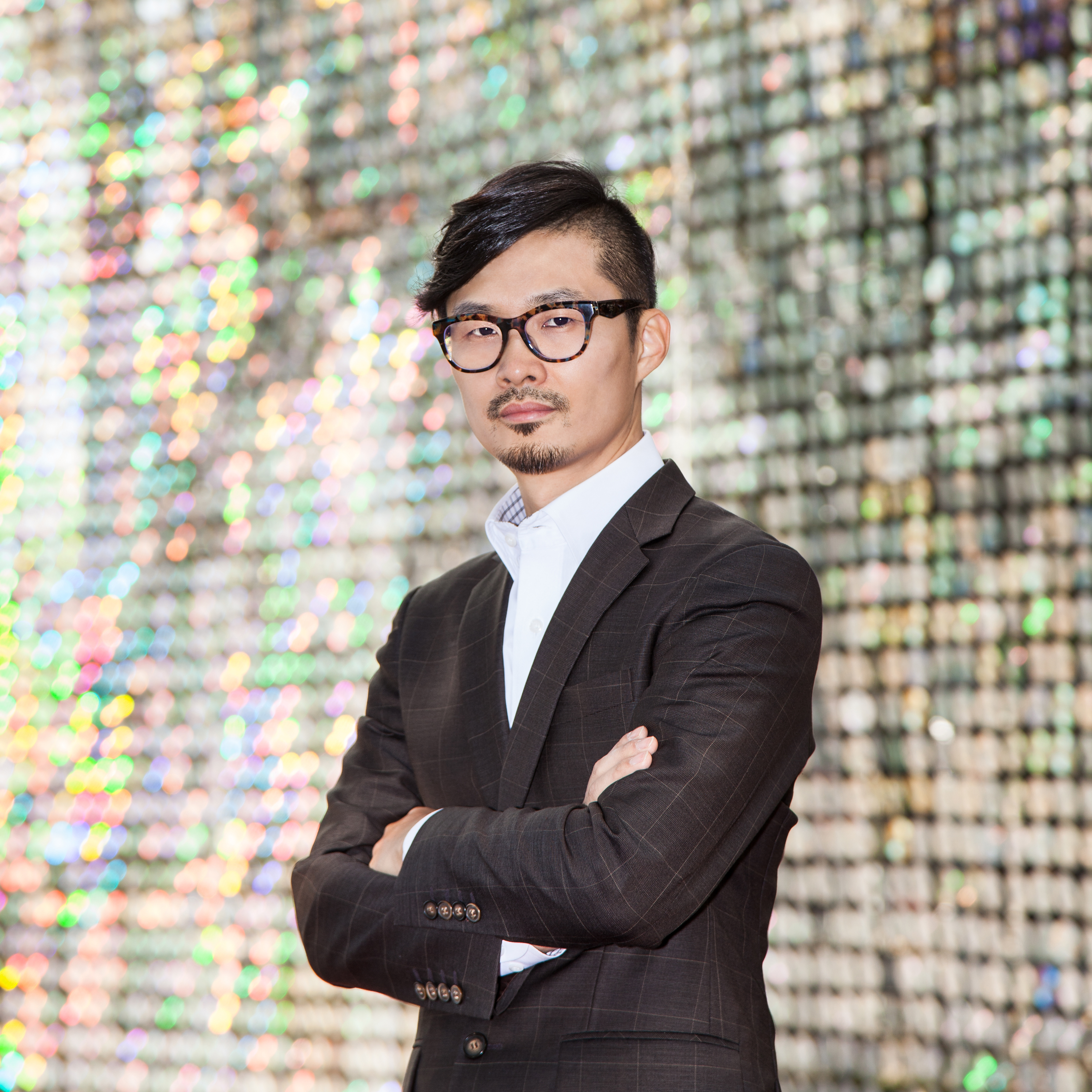
- Byeong Sam Jeon, October 2015
- Born: January 20, 1977 (age 49); Seoul, South Korea
- Education: School of the Art Institute of Chicago, Hongik University, University of California, Irvine
- Known for: Artist
- Notable work: CD PROJECT (2015), Telematic Drum Circle (2007-2009)

Korean name
- Hangul: 전병삼
- Hanja: 全丙森
- RR: Jeon Byeongsam
- MR: Chŏn Pyŏngsam
- Website: http://www.bsjeon.com

Byeong Sam Jeon (born January 20, 1977) is an internationally recognized South Korean artist who lives in Seoul and New York. One of his large-scale art installations is CD PROJECT that turned an abandoned old tobacco factory into a shiny dream factory through decorating the 180 meter-long and 32 meter-high outer wall of the factory building with the total 489,440 flattering compact discs collected by 27,912 people from 288 organizations in 31 cities of 9 countries. The total number of the CDs installed was counted by the official Guinness World Records, and announced as the 'Largest Display of Compact Discs'. His works and sketch/prototypes of the giant installations have sold for substantial sums of money by the galleries and private collectors.

He holds a master's degree in fine arts from the School of the Art Institute of Chicago, and also holds the master's degree in information and computer science from the University of California, Irvine. The Ministry of Science, ICT and Future Planning of South Korea announced him as one of the representative convergence type personnel 'Homo Creaens' in 2014. His work explores how interdisciplinary research influences the society in creative ways and makes the world more diverse. One of his well-known works, Telematic Drum Circle has gathered more than 320,000 Internet users and offline participants from 59 countries to promote global harmony across the world since it was released in September 2007 at the California Institute of Telecommunication and Information Technology. Byeong Sam Jeon has presented his work worldwide mainly including: SIGGRAPH (United States), ISIMD (Turkey), AsiaGraph (China), ArtBots (Ireland), Salon (Cuba), LIFE (Russia), Netfilmmakers (Denmark), SIAF (Japan), TMCA (South Korea), Siggraph ASIA (Singapore), and many more. He also worked as the executive creative director of the 2015 Cheongju International Craft Biennale, and brought 310,000 visitors in 40 days of the event.

== Notable works ==
- CD PROJECT
- Dynamic Relaxation
- Pangdoranee
- Beautility
- GreenSphere
- Jeon-Byeong-Sam-Ryong-Ee
- Dream of the Sky
- Dialogues
- Digital MEM
- Dotted Nature
- Telematic Drum Circle
- Drop Drop
- Ten Worlds: Garden of Life
- We Are Romantic
- Miscommunication
- Dool-Momzit
- Half Moon
- Zoo II
- Nameless Baby
- Dreaming Bus
- Buddha's Inn
- Freedom Exists or Not
