= Kansong Art Museum =

Museum in Seoul, South Korea

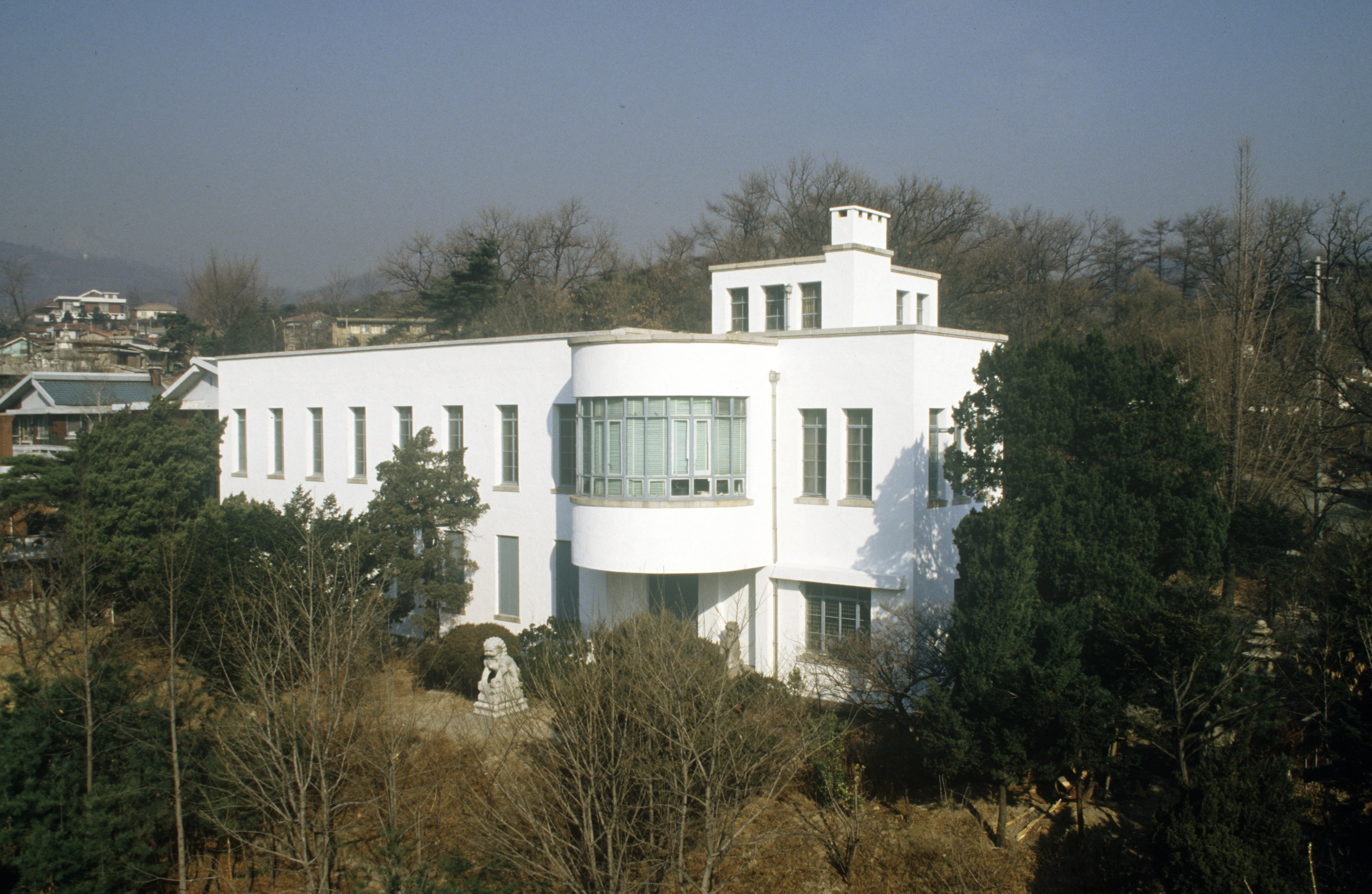
- Established: 1938
- Location: 87-1 Seongbuk-ro, Seongbuk District, Seoul, South Korea
- Coordinates: 37°35′39.13″N 126°59′47.68″E
- Founder: Jeon Hyeongpil
- Website: kansong.org

Korean name
- Hangul: 간송미술관
- Hanja: 澗松美術館
- RR: Gansong misulgwan
- MR: Kansong misulgwan

The Kansong Art Museum (Korean: 간송미술관) is located in Seongbuk-dong, Seongbuk District, Seoul, South Korea.

The predecessor to the museum, Bohwagak (보화각; 葆華閣), was founded by Jeon Hyeong-pil in 1938. It was the first privately owned museum in Korea, and showcased various Korean historical and artistic materials that Jeon had gathered. His goal was to prevent Japanese removal of Korean cultural properties during the Japanese colonial period. Numerous Korean cultural properties were taken to Japan, such as Goryeo porcelains, Silla-era Buddhist statues, and Joseon-era texts.

The museum was designed by architect Park Gil-ryong (박길룡). Jeon died in 1962; his sons Jeon Seong-u (전성우; 全晟雨) and Jeon Yeong-u (전영우; 全暎雨) continued his work in museum and art curation. In 1966, the Kansong Art Museum and the Korean Folk Art Research Institute (한국민족미술연구소; 韓國民族美術硏究所) were founded by the pair. The former entity shows pieces to the public, and the latter performs academic research. The museum is named for the art name of Jeon Hyeong-pil.

As of 2011, the museum housed twelve national treasures. This includes a copy of the Hunminjeongeum, which first described the Korean script Hangul (National Treasure No. 70). Other national treasures include Donggukjeongun Book 1, 2 (National Treasure No. 71), Geumdong gyemimyeong samjonbul (No. 72 National Treasure), and Hyewon pungsokdo.

== Gallery ==
Cheongja unhak sanggam mun maebyeong, the 68th national treasure

Hunmin Jeongeum

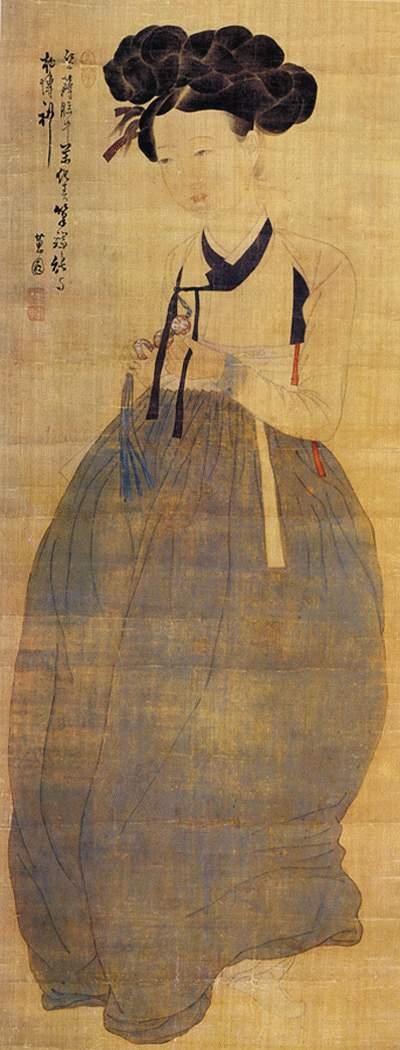
A portrait of a beauty painted by Hyewon

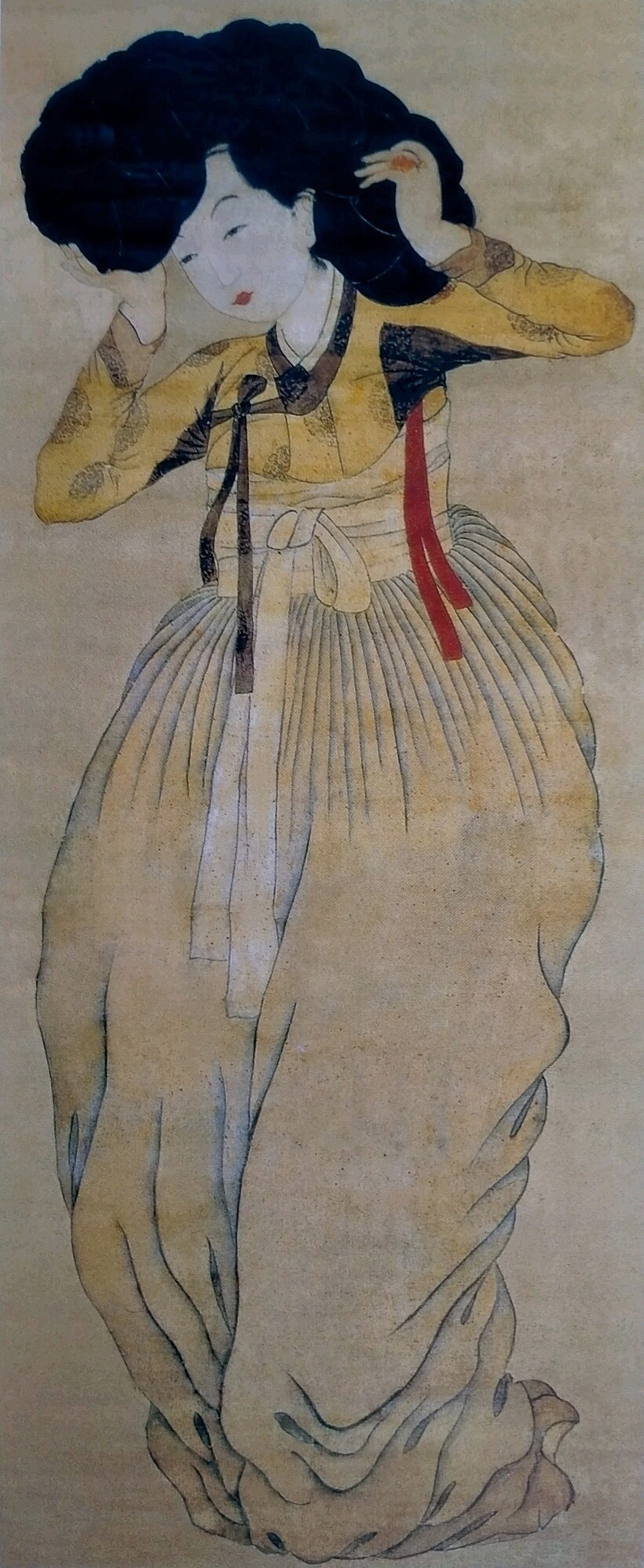
A portrait of a beauty handed down to Haenam Yun family

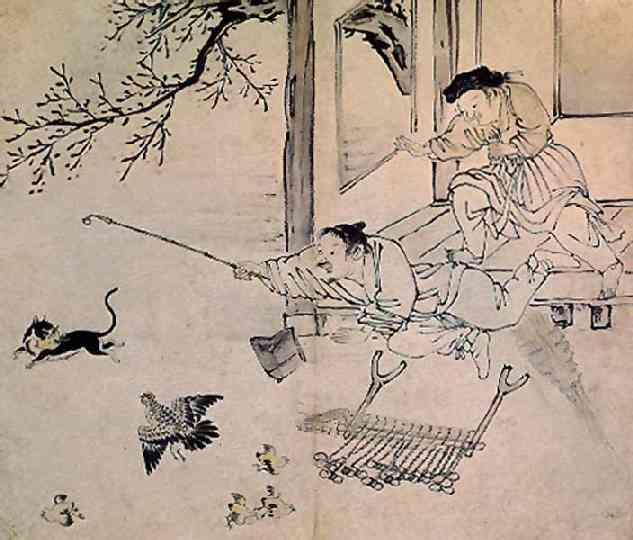
Pajeokdo drawn by Kim Deuksin

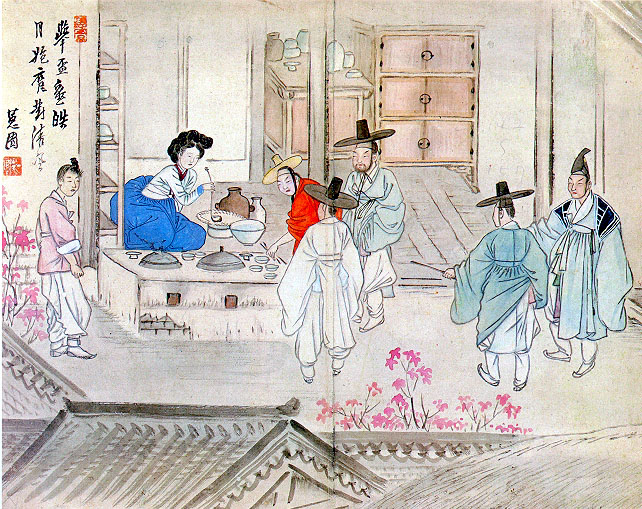
Holding a drinking party from Hyewon pungsokdo drawn by Hyewon

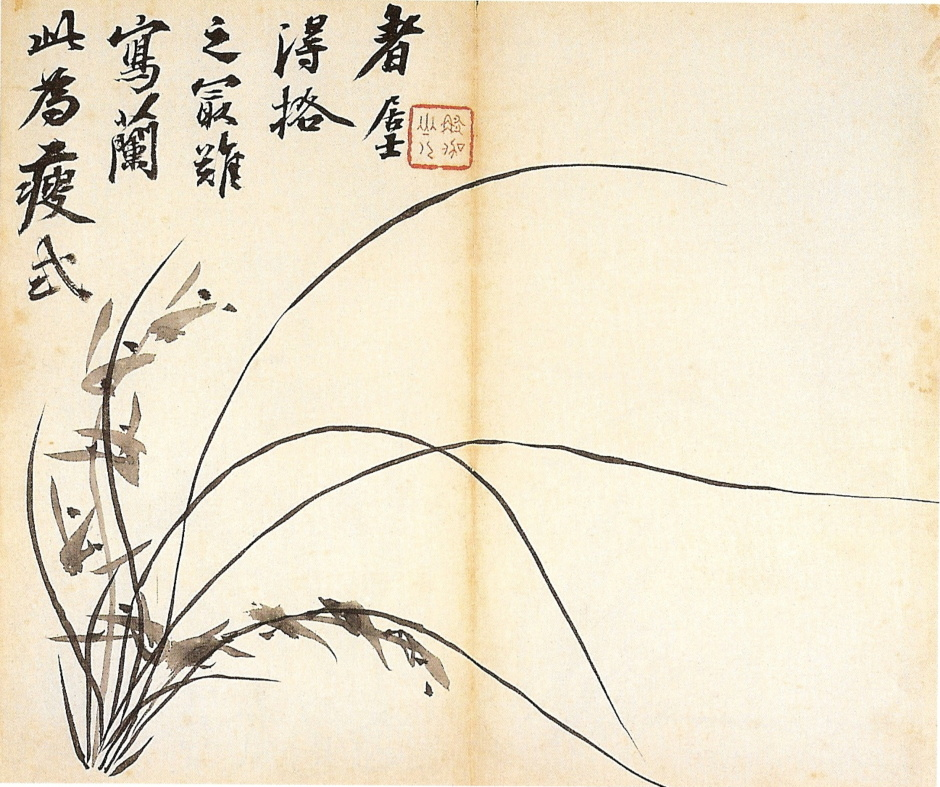
Susik deukgyek (수식득격 瘦式得格) painted and written by Chusa

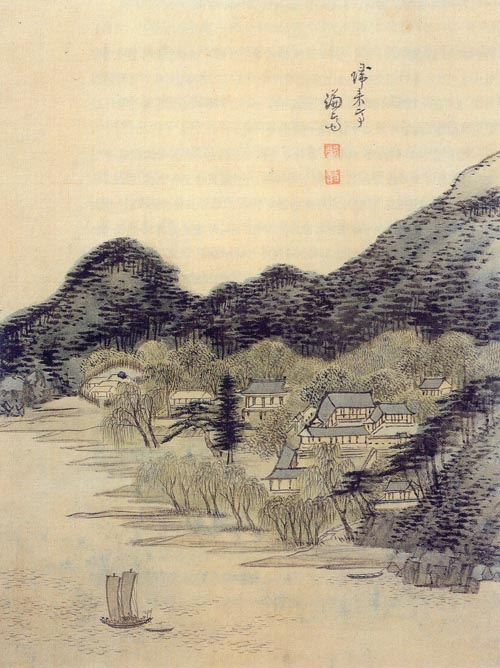
Gwuiraejeong (귀래정 歸來亭)

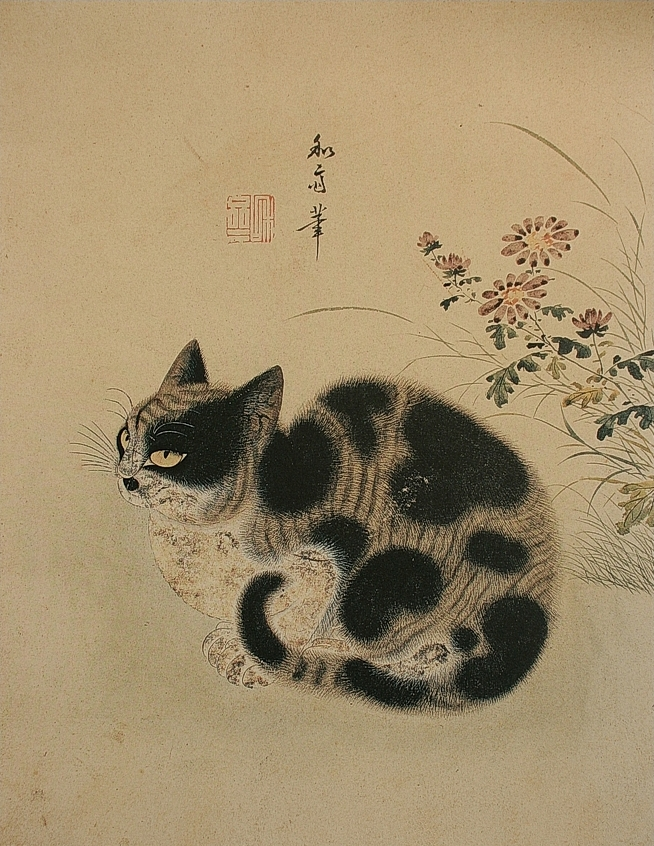
Gukjeong chumyo by Byeon Sang-byeok, 18th century

== See also ==
- Korean painting
- List of museums in South Korea
- National Treasures of South Korea
