= Cheongun-dong =

Coordinates: 37.584°N 126.971°E

- Interactive map of Cheongun-dong
- Country: South Korea

Area
  - Total: 1.67 km^{2} (0.64 sq mi)

Population (2001)
  - Total: 5,608
  - Density: 3,360/km^{2} (8,700/sq mi)

Korean name
- Hangul: 청운동
- Hanja: 淸雲洞
- RR: Cheongun-dong
- MR: Ch'ŏngun-dong

Cheongun-dong (Korean: 청운동) is a dong (neighborhood) of Jongno District, Seoul, South Korea.

== Attraction ==
- Gyeongbokgung
- Cheongwadae

== See also ==
- Administrative divisions of South Korea
