= Ho-Am Art Museum =

Museum in Yongin, South Korea

Coordinates: 37°17′41″N 127°11′29″E

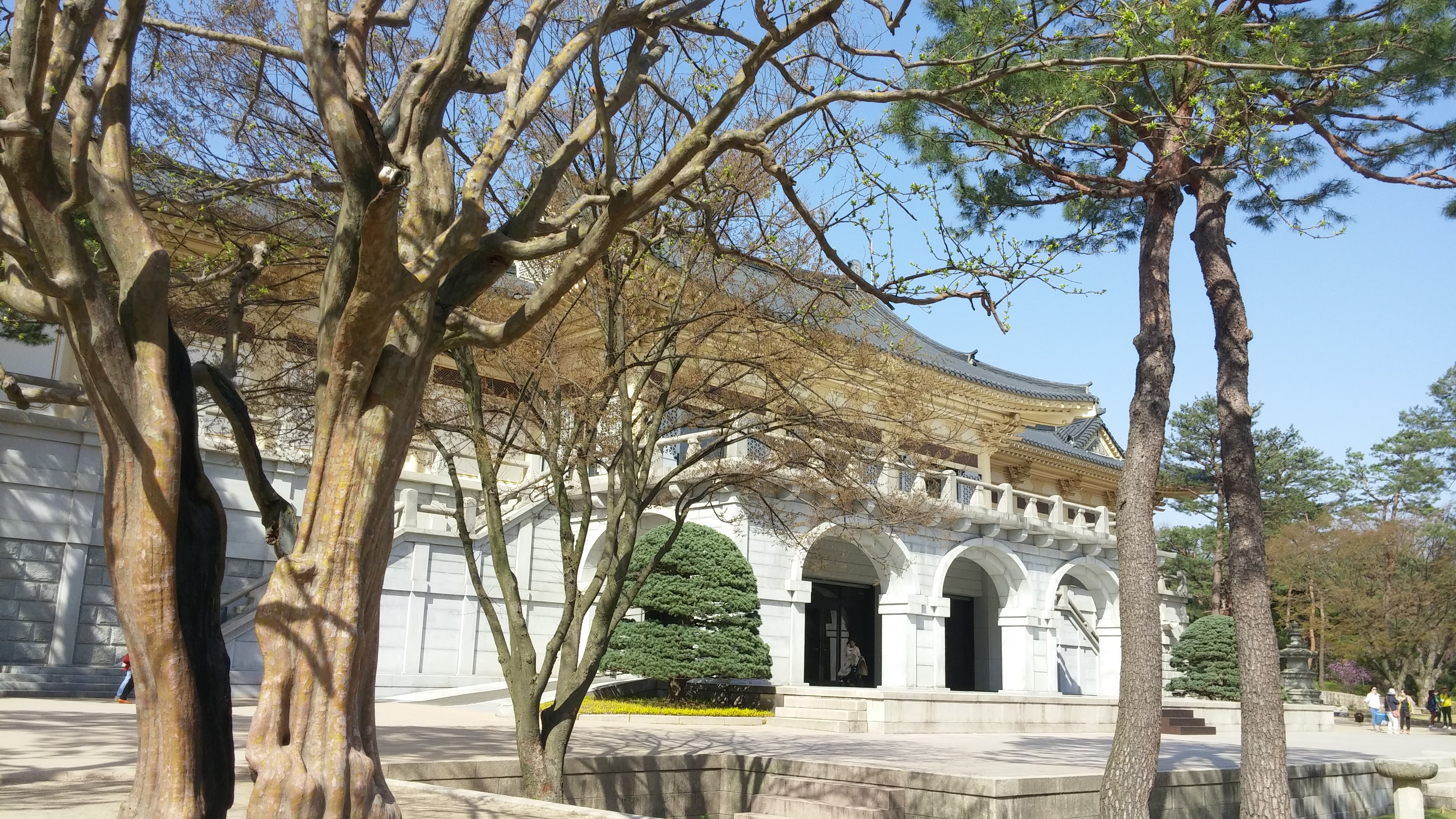
Ho-Am Art Museum

The Ho-Am Art Museum (Korean: 호암미술관) is an art museum in Yongin, Gyeonggi-do, South Korea, approximately 40 kilometres (25 mi) south of Seoul. It holds a number of traditional Korean paintings.

The museum was built in 1982 by Samsung and named after their former chairman, Lee Byung-chul. Ho-Am is his pen name which means filling up a space with clear water as lakes do, and being unshakeable as a large rock. It is located in the Everland Resort. The museum includes a re-created Korean traditional garden, known as the Hee Won Garden.

== See also ==
- Korean art
- List of museums in South Korea
