= Myojakdo =

17th century Korean painting

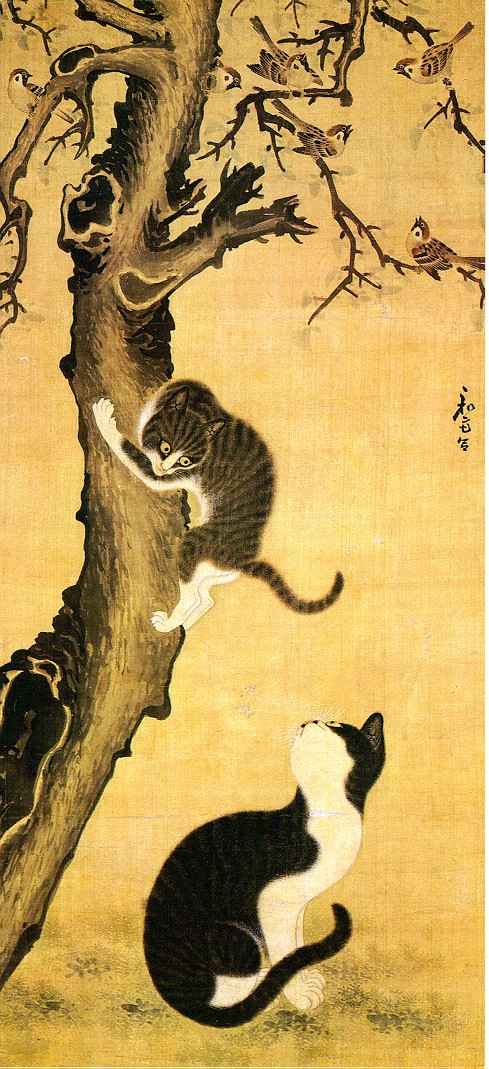
- Myojakdo

Korean name
- Hangul: 묘작도
- Hanja: 猫雀圖
- Lit.: Painting of Cats and Sparrows
- RR: Myojakdo
- MR: Myojakto

Myojakdo (Korean: 묘작도; lit. Painting of Cats and Sparrows) is a Korean painting depicting two cats and sparrows on an old tree, drawn by Byeon Sang-byeok during the late 17th century, in the period of the Korean Joseon Dynasty (1392–1910). It is regarded as a representative animal painting (yeongmohwa) and is painted on silk with light coloring over the ink and wash painting (sumukhwa). The Myojakdo is 93.7 cm in height and 42.9 cm in width. It forms part of the collection of the National Museum of Korea in Seoul, South Korea.

== Description ==
Byeon Sang-byeok is renowned for his skillful depictions of cats and chickens, so he was referred to as the nicknames, "Byeon goyangi" (literally Byeon cat), and "Byeon dak" (Byeon rooster) during his lifetime. The myojakdo backs up the record in which Byeon favored cats and devoted to cat paintings.

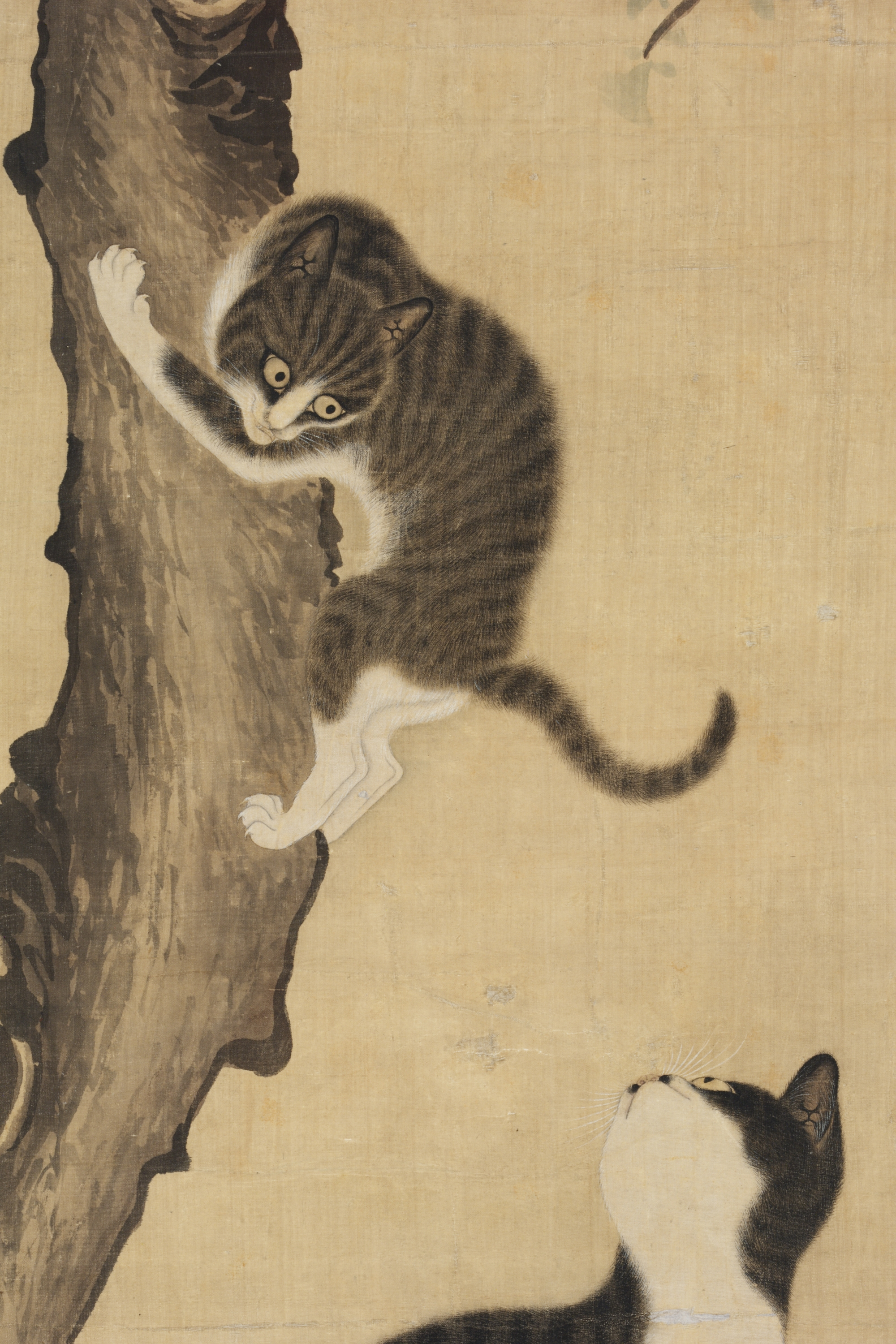
Myo (猫; cat)

Cats and sparrows were often subjects for Korean paintings drawn to celebrate the joy of longevity because of their similar pronunciations with other words that have auspicious meanings. The pronunciation of myo (猫; cat) and jak (雀, sparrow) in hanja word, or Sino-Korean words are respectively linked with mo (耄; old person) which refers to 80 or 90 years old, and jak (鵲) which indicates magpie having been regarded as an auspicious bird in Korean society.

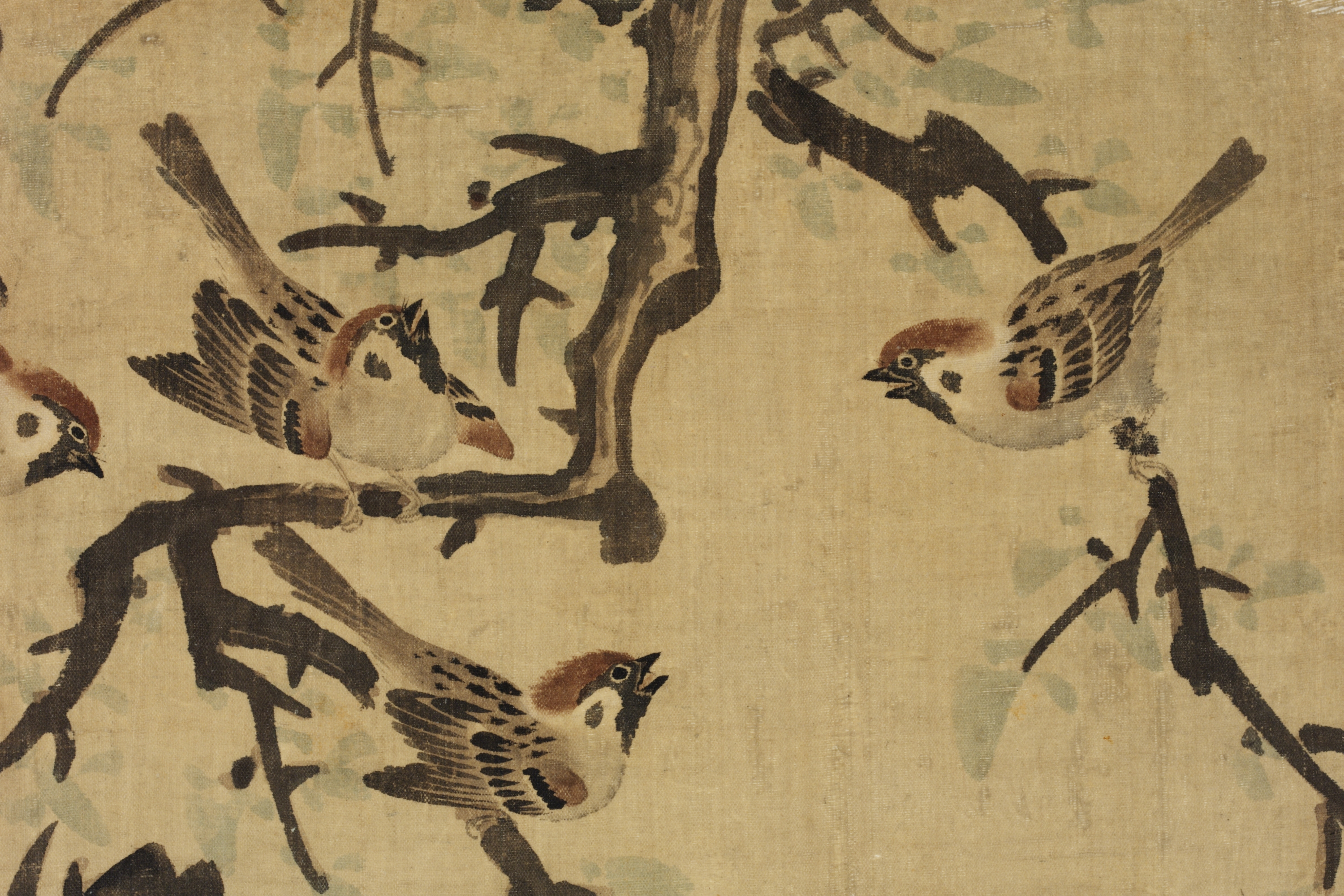
Jak (雀, sparrow)

In this painting, cats and sparrows are depicted realistically in a simple and dynamic composition. The depiction of a group of chirping sparrows on twigs are illustrated precisely with very detailed brushstrokes. Byeon's mastered drawing techniques are also noted with the lively facial expressions and moves of the two cats. One cat clinging to the side of an old tree exchanges glances with the other on the ground in the diagonal composition as if they communicated with each other. On the other hand, the body of the old tree is drawn with rather wild brushstrokes, which represents the meager texture and the distorted shape having formed for a long time. The stark contrast between the way the animals and trees are applied gives a strong feeling of movement to the picture.

== See also ==
- Gukjeong chumyo, Byeon Sang-byoek's other cat painting.
- Shin Saimdang, a painter known for insect painting.
- Sim Sa-jeong
- Bird-and-flower painting
