= Gukjeong chumyo =

Painting from 18th century Korea

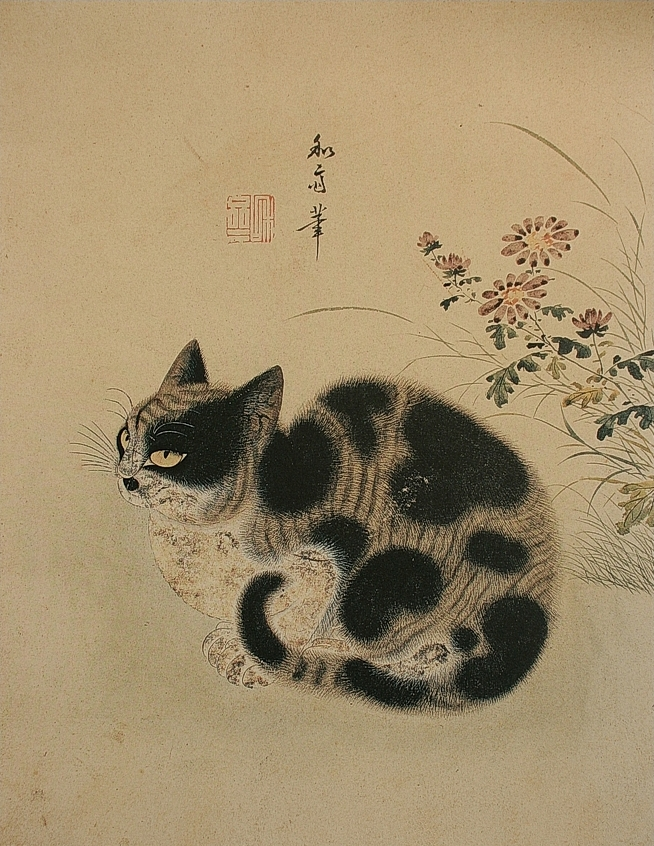
- Gukjeong chumyo (literally, "An autumn cat in a garden with chrysanthemum")

Korean name
- Hangul: 국정추묘
- Hanja: 菊庭秋猫
- Revised Romanization: Gukjeong chumyo
- McCune–Reischauer: Kukchŏng ch'umyo

Gukjeong chumyo (Korean: 국정추묘) is an 18th-century Korean painting depicting a crouching cat under a wild chrysanthemum on an autumn day. It was drawn by Byeon Sang-byeok, who usually painted animals during the late period of the Korean Joseon Dynasty (1392–1910). Gukjeong chumyo literally means "An autumn cat in a garden with chrysanthemum" and is of the yeongmohwa, or animal painting, genre. It is painted on paper with light coloring over the ink and wash painting (sumukhwa). The size of the painting is 29.5 cm (11.6 in) in height and 23.4 cm (9.2 in) in width. It is currently stored at Gansong Art Museum in Seoul, South Korea.

Byeon Sang-byeok is renowned for his skillful depictions of cats and chickens, so he was referred to by the nicknames "Byeon goyangi" (literally "Byeon cat") and "Byeon dak" (Byeon rooster) during his lifetime. His representative paintings include Myojakdo (Painting of Cats and Sparrows), and Hwajomyogudo (Painting of Flowers, Birds, and Puppies). The cat in the picture is crouching and gazing at something, and seems ready to swiftly run off.

== See also ==
- Shin Saimdang
- Sim Sa-jeong
- Bird-and-flower painting
