= Yun Tusŏ =

Korean painter (1668–1715)

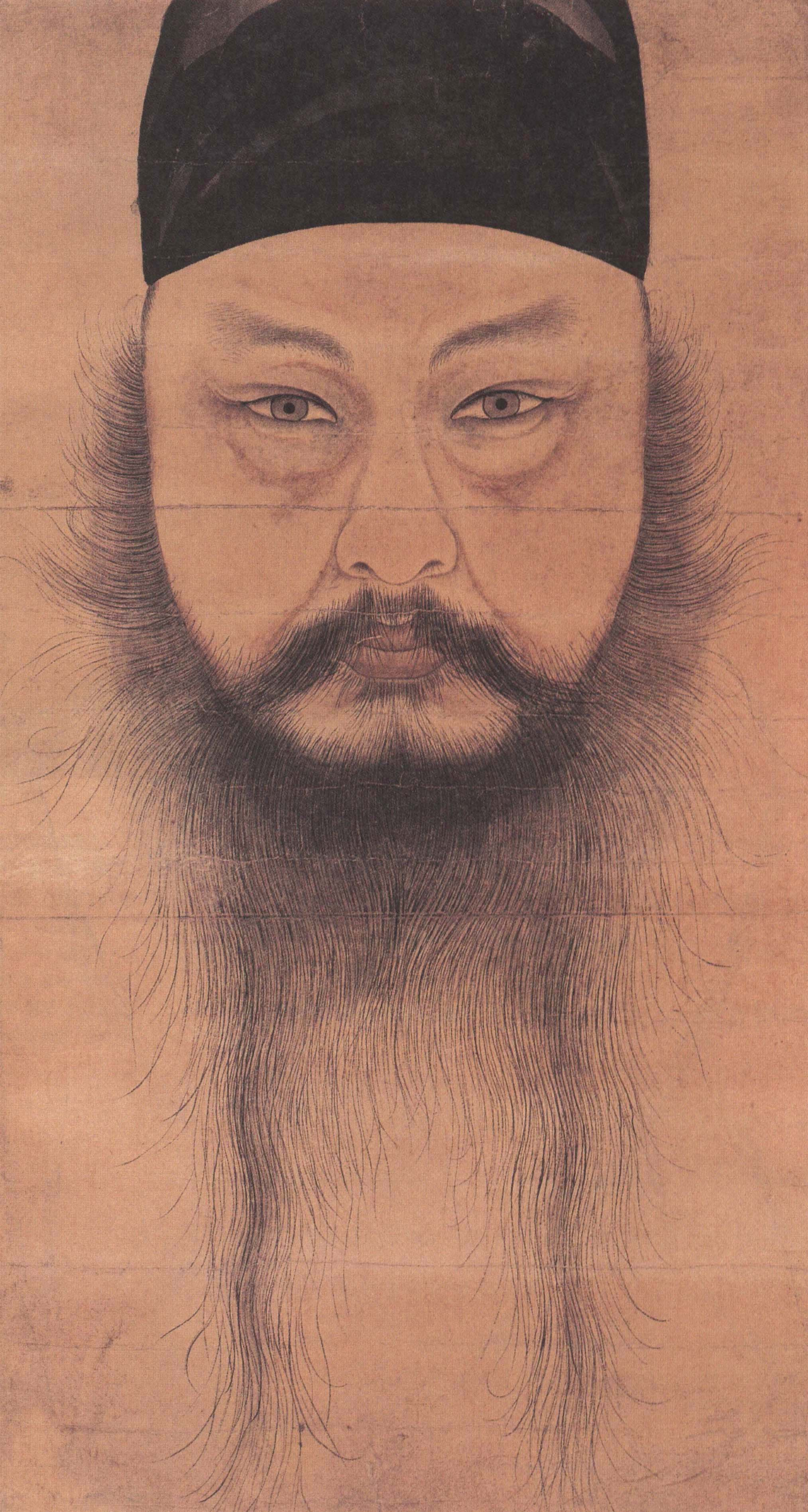
- Self-portrait of Yun Tusŏ

Korean name
- Hangul: 윤두서
- Hanja: 尹斗緖
- RR: Yun Duseo
- MR: Yun Tusŏ

Art name
- Hangul: 공재
- Hanja: 恭齋
- RR: Gongjae
- MR: Kongjae

Courtesy name
- Hangul: 효언
- Hanja: 孝彦
- RR: Hyoeon
- MR: Hyoŏn

Yun Tusŏ (Korean: 윤두서; Hanja: 尹斗緖; 28 July 1668 – 21 December 1715) was a painter and scholar of the Joseon period. He is the grandson of Yun Sŏndo, a great scholar in Korean history. He passed the gwageo exam, but did not enter government service. Rather, he devoted his whole life to painting and studying Confucianism. His self-portrait is regarded as one of the many masterpieces of Korean art. Yun Tusŏ is also known for his yeongmohwa (animal-and-bird painting). He was a member of the Haenam Yun clan (해남 윤씨; 海南 尹氏).

== Gallery ==
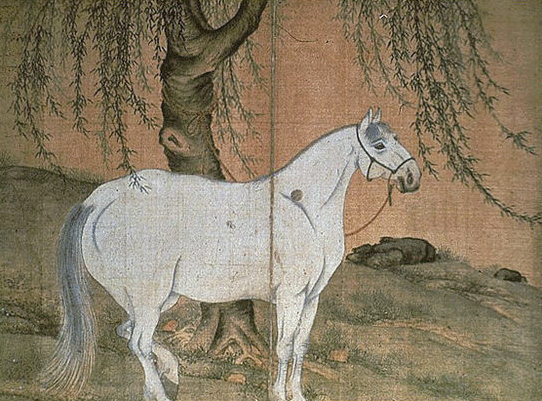
White horse under the willow (유하백마도)

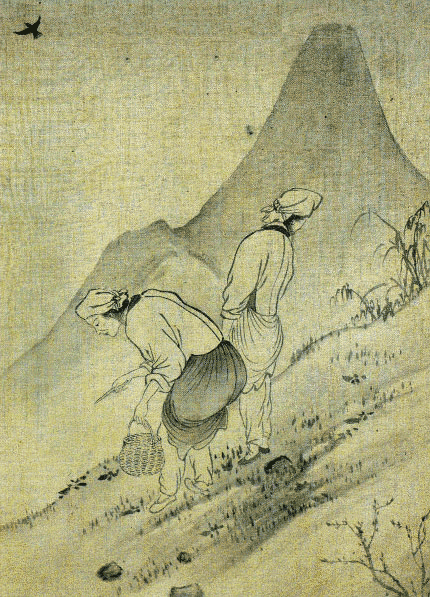
Women Picking Edible Plants

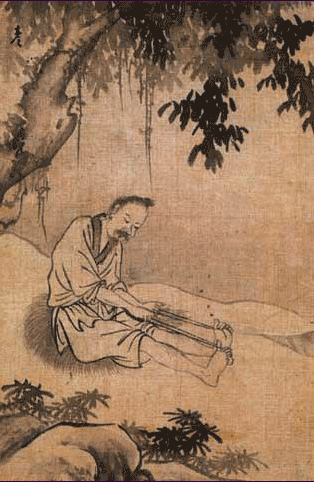
Old Man Making Straw Shoes

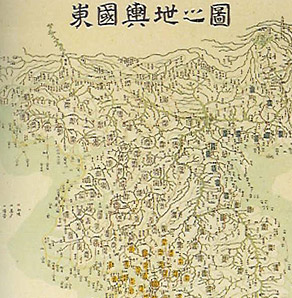
Dongguk yeoji jido (동국여지지도) drawn by Yun Duseo

== Family ==
- Father
  - Yun Isŏk (윤이석; 尹爾錫)
- Mother
  - Lady Sim of the Cheongsong Sim clan (청송 심씨)
- Spouse
  - Princess Jeongmyeong (정명공주 전주 이씨)
- Issue
  - Son - Yun Tŏkhŭi (윤덕희; 尹德熙; 1685–1776)
  - Son - Yun Tŏngnyŏl (윤덕렬; 尹德烈; 1698–1745)

== See also ==
- Korean painting
- List of Korean painters
- Korean art
- Korean culture
