= Goguryeo art =

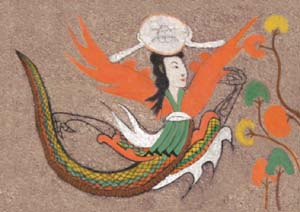
A depiction of the moon goddess from a Goguryeo tomb

Goguryeo art is the art of Goguryeo, an ancient Korean kingdom (37 BCE – 668 CE) which occupied large areas of present-day Northeast China and Korea. Its distinct style is marked by flowing lines and vivid colors. The prime examples of this style are tomb murals excavated in North Korea and Manchuria, which were produced from the 3rd to 7th centuries.

== See also ==
- Korean art
- Korean painting
- Three Kingdoms of Korea
