= Pyŏn Sangbyŏk =

Korean painter (fl. 18th century)

- Hangul: 변상벽
- Hanja: 卞相璧, 卞尙璧
- RR: Byeon Sangbyeok
- MR: Pyŏn Sangbyŏk

Art name
- Hangul: 화재
- Hanja: 和齋
- RR: Hwajae
- MR: Hwajae

Courtesy name
- Hangul: 완보
- Hanja: 完甫
- RR: Wanbo
- MR: Wanbo

Pyŏn Sangbyŏk (Korean: 변상벽) was an 18th-century Korean painter of the Miryang Pyŏn clan during the late period of the Korean Joseon dynasty (1392–1910). Pyŏn is famous for his precise depictions of animals and people in detailed brushwork.

== Biography ==
His courtesy name is Wanbo and art name is Hwajae. His birth and death dates are unknown, but was active in the mid 18th century during King Sukjong's (r. 1674–1720) and King Yeongjo's reign (r. 1724–1776). Pyŏn was praised for his excellent depictions of animals and people. He served as a royal painter of Dohwaseo, the office of painting and then as a hyeongam, a magistrate of a small province. According to the book titled Jinhui sokgo (震彙續攷), Pyŏn Sangbyŏk was especially excellent at depicting cats and chicken, so he gained nicknames like Pyŏn Goyang (trans. Pyŏn Cat) and Pyŏn Dak (Pyŏn Rooster). In addition, the book says that Pyŏn was famous for drawing portraits too, so he was also referred as Guksu (國手, a first class artisan) of the time, and his portrait works are over 100 pieces. Though, one of his extant portraits, the portrait of Yun Geup, an officer, does not show his excellent skills. He participated in drawing the portraits of King Yeongjo in 1763 and 1773.

== Works ==
Pyŏn's representative works include "Myojakdo" (Painting of Cats and Sparrows) and "Gyejado" (Painting of a Chicken and Chicks). Myojakdo housed in the National Museum of Korea captures a lively scene of two cats and alarmed sparrows around a tree in detailed brushwork. The depiction of a group of chirping sparrows on twigs are illustrated precisely with very detailed brushstrokes. It is based on his deep affections toward animals and close observations in real life.

== Gallery ==
Pyŏn prints

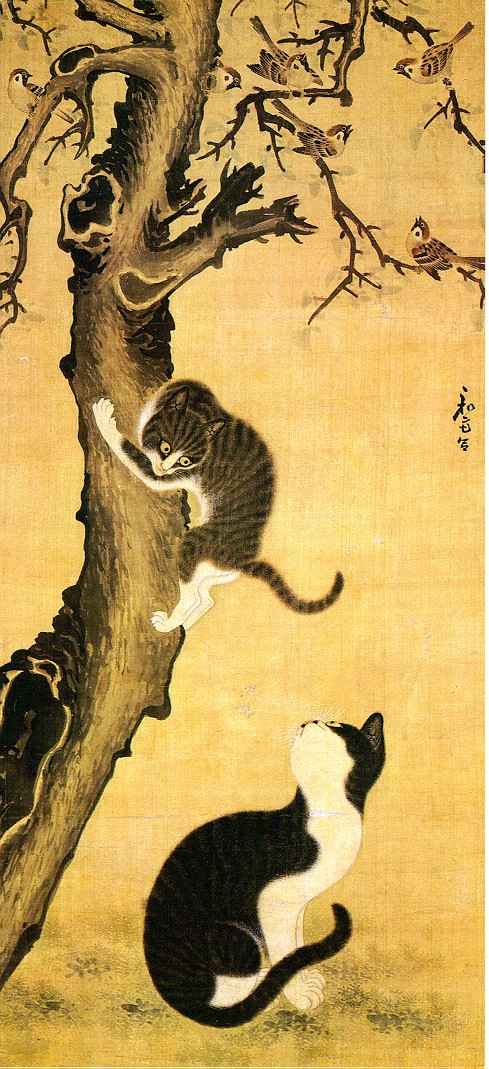
Myojakdo ("Painting of Cats and Sparrows")

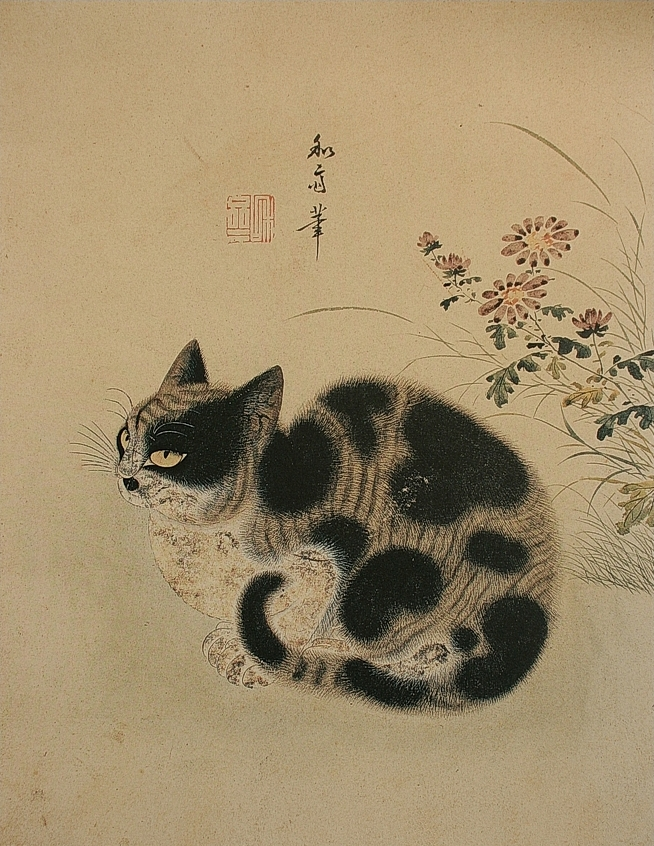
Gukjeong chumyo ("Autumn cat in a garden with chrysanthemum")

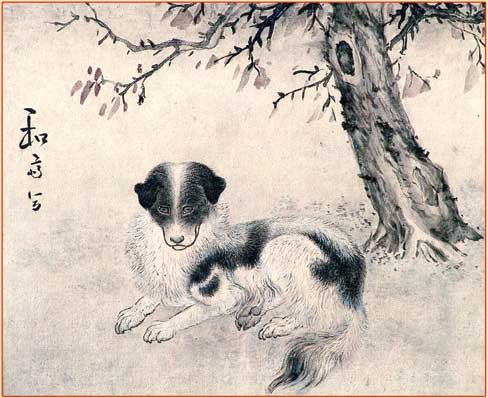
Gyeondo (painting of a dog)

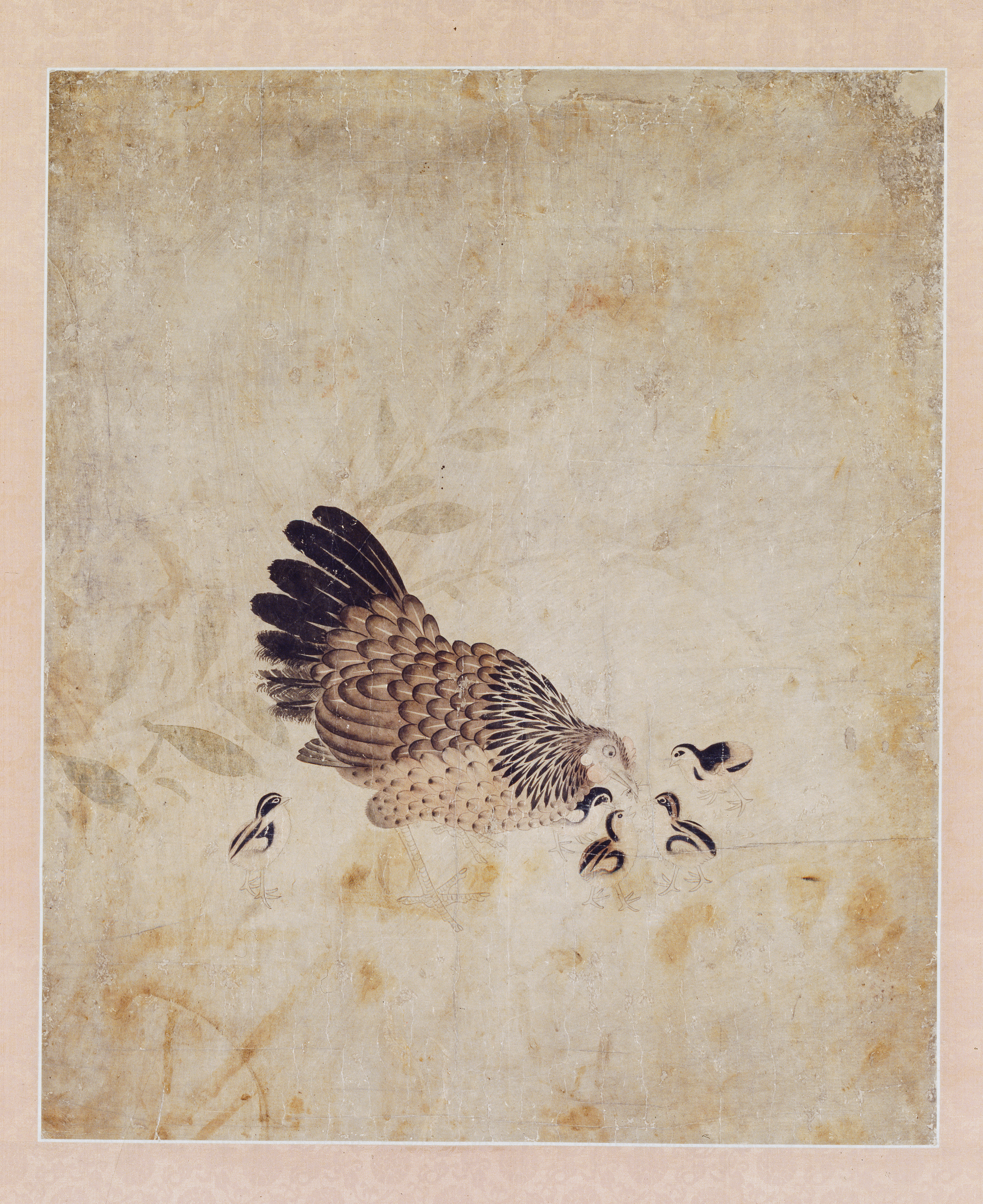
Mother Hen and Chicks

== See also ==
- Korean painting
- List of Korean painters
- Korean art
- Korean culture
