= Cho Hŭiryong =

Korean painter (1789–1866)

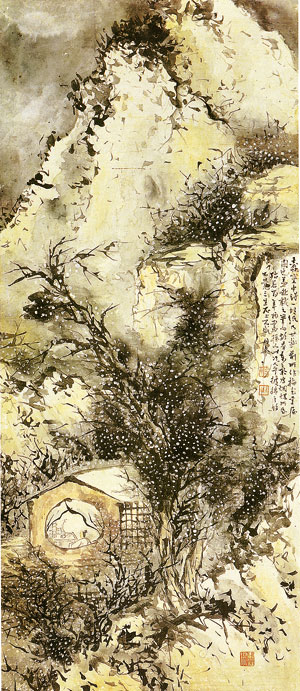

Korean name
- Hangul: 조희룡
- Hanja: 趙熙龍
- RR: Jo Huiryong
- MR: Cho Hŭiryong

Art name
- Hangul: 우봉, 석감, 철적, 호산, 단로, 매수
- Hanja: 又峰, 石憨, 鐵笛, 壺山, 丹老, 梅叟
- RR: Ubong, Seokgam, Cheoljeok, Hosan, Danro, Maesu
- MR: Ubong, Sŏkkam, Ch'ŏlchŏk, Hosan, Tallo, Maesu

Courtesy name
- Hangul: 치운
- Hanja: 致雲
- RR: Chiun
- MR: Ch'iun

Cho Hŭiryong (Korean: 조희룡; Hanja: 趙熙龍; 1789–1866) was a painter during the late Joseon Dynasty, born in Hanyang (today Seoul).

He grouped Byeokosisa in 1847, visiting Mount Kumgang by the order of King Heonjong in 1849 and later presented the poem. However, he was banished to Imja island in Sinan county from 1851 to 1853.

King Heonjong was highly interested in calligraphy and drawings, which affected his posture during his era. Kim Jeong-hui also acknowledged him as the most talented painter at the time. He became professional in writing Chusache (calligraphy) originated by Kim Jeong hui and also left several writings.

He enjoyed drawing flowers and scenery in great quality, and was said to be fond of painting apricot flowers. Aside from flowers, his painting also dealt with bamboos and pine trees which were one of the most popular and observed themes of Korean painting. His painting named "Mokjukdo" (The painting of Trees and Bamboo) is housed in the National museum of Korea.

== See also ==
- Kim Jeong-hui
- An Kyŏn
- Silhak
