= Sim Sajŏng =

Korean painter (1707–1769)

- Hangul: 심사정
- Hanja: 沈師正
- RR: Sim Sajeong
- MR: Sim Sajŏng

Art name
- Hangul: 현재
- Hanja: 玄齋
- RR: Hyeonjae
- MR: Hyŏnjae

Courtesy name
- Hangul: 이숙
- RR: Isuk
- MR: Isuk

Sim Sajŏng (Korean: 심사정; Hanja: 沈師正; 1707–1769), was a representative painter in the literati artist's style along with Jeong Seon in 18th Joseon period. He learned to paint from Jeong Seon, so he was influenced by his teacher. He was good at almost all genres of painting such as muninhwa (문인화, painting in the literati style), sansuhwa (산수화, landscape painting), yeongmohwa (영모화, animal-and-bird painting), inmulhwa (figure painting).

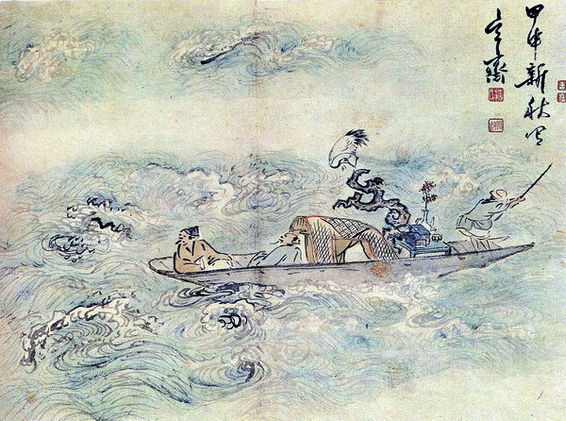

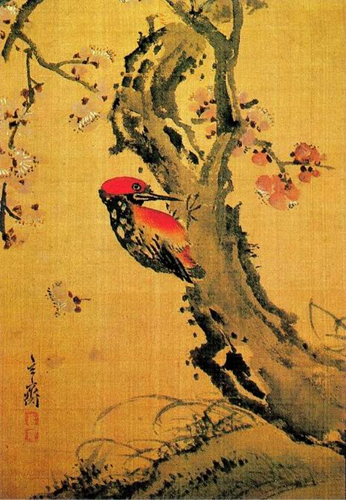

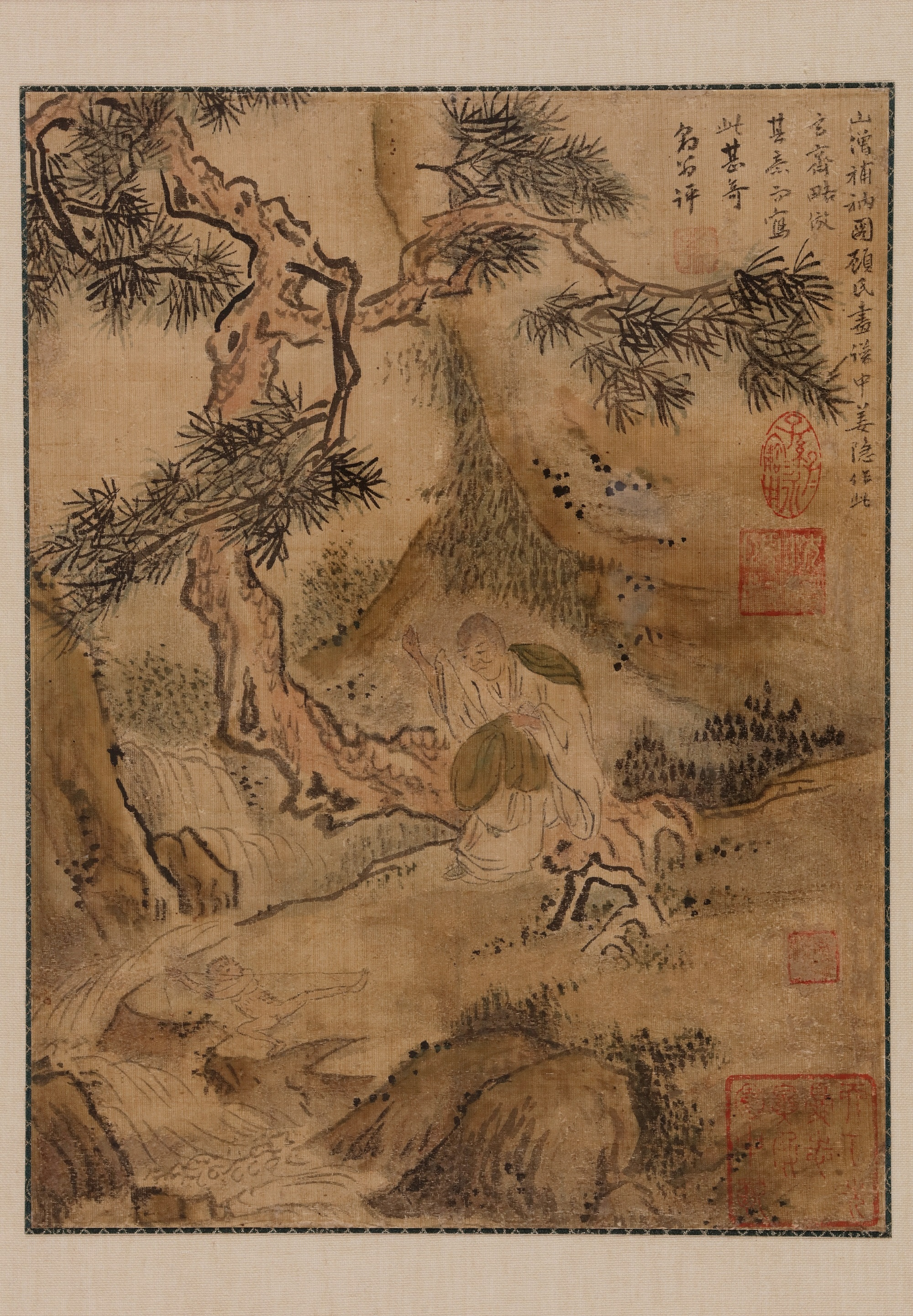

== See also ==
- Korean painting
- List of Korean painters
- Korean art
- Korean culture
