= Kim Sang-soon =

South Korean artist (fl. 20th–21st centuries)

- Hangul: 김상순
- Hanja: 金相淳
- RR: Gim Sangsun
- MR: Kim Sangsun

Art name
- Hangul: 묵당
- Hanja: 墨堂
- RR: Mukdang
- MR: Muktang

Kim Sang-soon (Mookdang) is a contemporary South Korean artist.

Kim graduated from the College of Fine Art, Seoul National University. He was Director of the Oriental painting Department Korea Fine Artist Association from 1980 to 1982.

Today Kim is a member of Oriental Fine Art Association, Fine Art Association and member of the international formative Art Association.

== Selected list of exhibitions ==
- Mooklim (Oriental Painting) Association Members' Exhibition
- Modern Fine Invitation Exhibition (sponsored by the Choseon Daily Co.) (1959)
- International Free-Fine Art Invitation Exhibition (1959)
- Han-kuk (Korea) Oriental Painting Association (1966)
- Korean top senior Fine Artist Exhibition (1975)
- Exchange International Exhibition of Fine Art between Korea and Arabia (1980)
- Korea Modern Fine Art Invitation Exhibition (1982, 1983, 1984, 1985)
- Invitation Exhibition for Korea's 100 Fine Art Representatives (1986)
- Korea Fine Art Exhibition held in Germany (1997)
- Invited Exhibition for New Millennium Korea Total Art (2000)

== Prizes ==
- Special Prize from National Art Exhibition (3 times, 1970, 1976, 1977)
- General Prize from National Art Exhibition (2 times, 1974, 1975)

== See also ==
- Korean art
- Contemporary culture of South Korea
