= Korean painting =

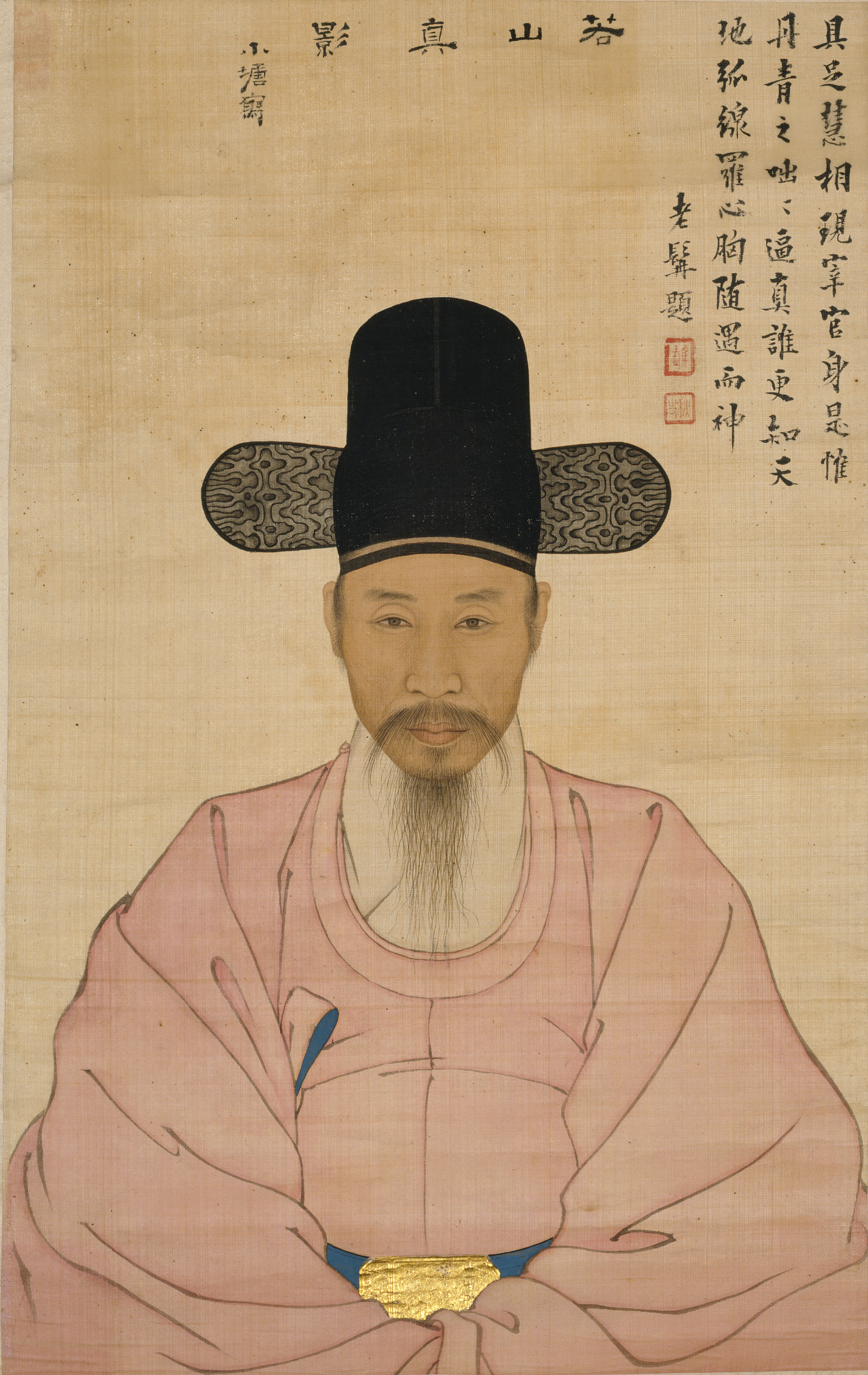
- Portrait of Kang Io by Yi Jaegwan (1783–1837)

Korean name
- Hangul: 한국화
- Hanja: 韓國畫
- RR: Hangukhwa
- MR: Han'gukhwa

Korean painting (Korean: 한국화) includes paintings made in Korea or by overseas Koreans on all surfaces. The earliest surviving Korean paintings are murals in the Goguryeo tombs; considerable numbers of these survive, the oldest from some 2,000 years ago (mostly now in North Korea), with scenes including dancers, hunting, and spirits. The Takamatsuzuka Tomb in Japan, from the 7th-century end of the Goguryeo period, has paintings hypothesized to have Goguryeo influence, done either by Goguryeo artists or by a Japanese artist with Goguryeo training.

Painting in the Goryeo period (918–1392) was dominated by Buddhist scroll paintings, adapting Chinese styles; about 160 survive from the period. In this period the royal artist's school or academy, the Dohwaseo, was established, run by bureaucrats of the court and with examinations for artists. Near the beginning of the Joseon period (1392–1897), the largely monochrome ink-wash painting tradition already long-established in China was introduced and has remained an important strand in Korean and Japanese painting, with the local version of the shan shui style of mountain landscape painting as important as in China.

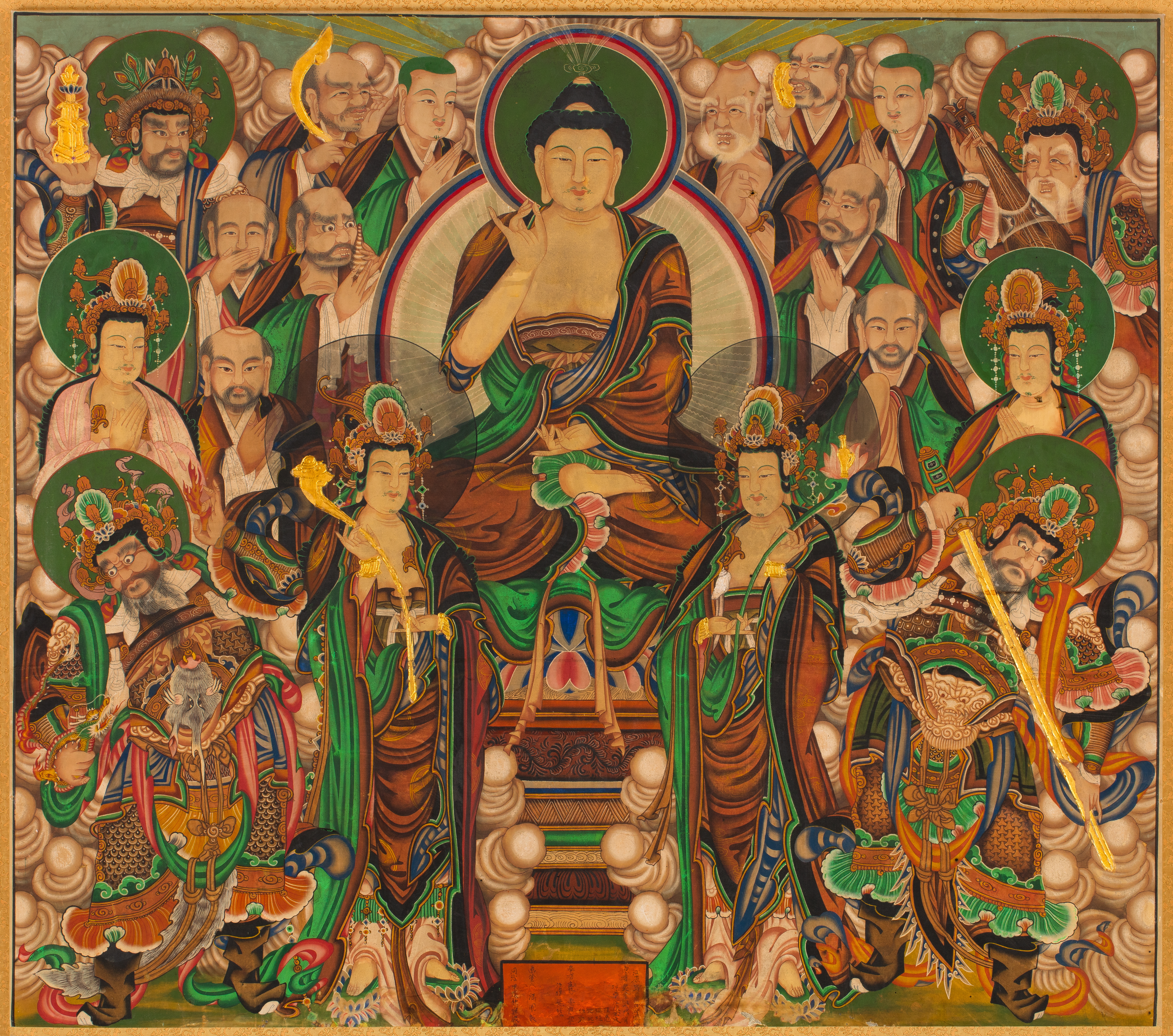
Taenghwa, Rear Altar Buddhist Banner Painting, Joseon, Samcheok Municipal Museum

Thereafter Korean painting included multiple traditions: monochromatic works of black brushwork, sometimes by amateurs; professional works with colour, including many genre scenes; animal and bird-and-flower painting; and colourful folk art called minhwa, as well as a continuing tradition of Buddhist devotional scrolls called taenghwa, ritual arts, tomb paintings, and festival arts which had extensive use of colour. This distinction was often class-based: scholars, especially in Confucian art, felt that one could see colour in monochromatic paintings within the gradations and that the actual use of colour coarsened the paintings and restricted the imagination. Korean folk art and painting of architectural frames were seen as brightening certain outside wood frames, again within the tradition of Chinese architecture and early Buddhist influences of profuse rich halos and primary colours inspired by Indian art.

Korean painters in the post-1945 period have assimilated some western approaches. Certain European artists with thick impasto technique and foregrounded brushstrokes captured Korean interest first. Such artists as Gauguin, Monticelli, Van Gogh, Cézanne, Pissarro, and Braque have been highly influential, as they have been the most taught in art schools, with books both readily available and translated into Korean early. From these have been drawn the tonal palettes of modern Korean artists: yellow ochre, cadmium yellow, Naples yellow, red earth, and sienna. All are thickly painted, roughly stroked, and often showing heavily textured canvases or thick pebbled handmade papers.

== Genre subjects ==
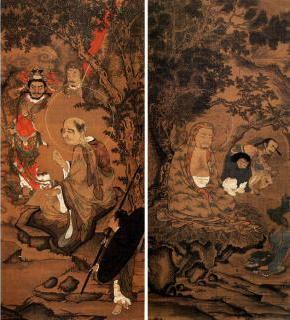
Arahat, Joseon buddhist painting in the 16th century Korea.

The expected genres of Buddhist art showing the Buddha or Buddhist monks, and Confucian art of scholars in repose or studying in quiet, often mountainous surroundings follow general East Asian art trends. Nimbus colours are not necessarily gold, and may be suggested by lighter colours. Faces tend to realism and show humanity and age. Drapery is done with some to great care. The face is generally two-dimensional, the drapery three-dimensional. As in medieval and renaissance western art, drapery and faces are done often by two or three artists who specialize in one particular painterly skill. Iconography follows Buddhist iconography.

Scholars tend to have the traditional stove-pipe hats, or other rank hats, and scholar's monochromatic robes. Typically, they are at rest in teahouses near mountains or at mountain lodges, or will be pictured with their teachers or mentors.

Hunting scenes, familiar worldwide, are often seen in Korean courtly art and are reminiscent of Mongolian and Persian hunting scenes. Wild boar, deer, stags, and Siberian tigers were hunted. Particularly lethal spears and spear-handled maces were used by horsemen within hunting grounds after ground archers acted as beaters and led the initial provocation of the animals. Buddhas tend to have Korean facial features and are in easy resting positions.

== Categories ==
=== Daoist Paintings ===
- Longevity symbols: Pictures of the ten longevity symbols figure most prominently among folk paintings of this category. The ten longevity symbols (Shipjangsaengdo), including the sun, clouds, mountains, water, bamboo, pine, crane, deer, turtle, and the mushroom of immortality are the often presented all together in a single picture.

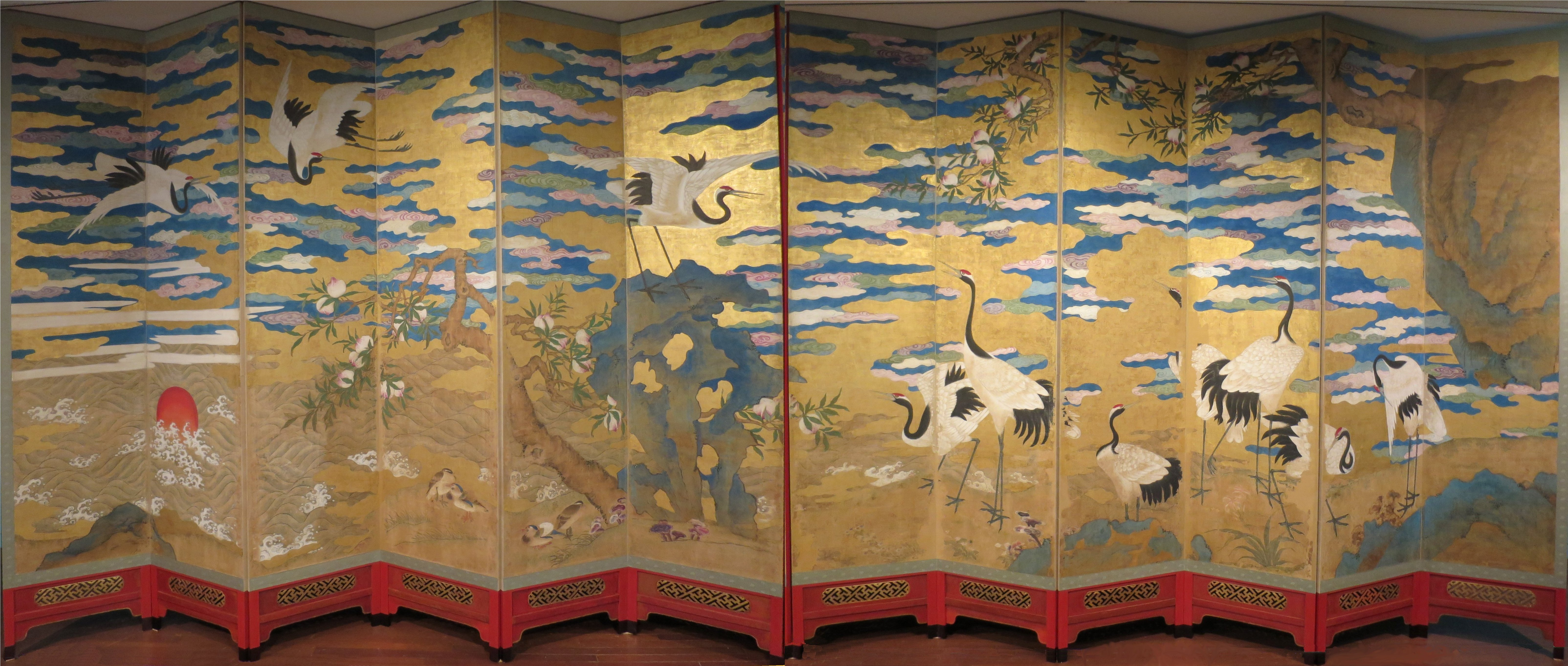
Cranes and Peaches, Choson dynasty, Honolulu Museum of Art

- Tiger: The tiger was among the most popular motifs in Korea folk painting. Likely originating from the mythical "white tiger" guardian spirit of the east, the tiger in Korean folk traditions is seldom portrayed as a ferocious beast but rather as a friendly and sometimes even funny and stupid animal.
- The mountain spirit and dragon king: The popular mountain spirit and dragon king motifs have their origins in two famous Korean historical figures, Dangun and Munmu. Dangun is the legendary progenitor of the Korean people and is said to have turned into a mountain spirit. The dragon king is usually depicted as a mighty animal flying amidst the clouds over a sea of high waves.
- The Naewat-dang shamanic paintings are among the oldest shamanic paintings known in Korea.

=== Buddhist Paintings ===
Buddhist temples and hermitages across the country are rich archives of folk paintings, ranging from large icon images for ritual use to illustrations for sutras and anecdotes about famous monks and their portraits. These temple painting are noted for simple compositions and bright colors.

=== Confucian Paintings ===
Folk paintings in this category include character designs of the popular themes of loyalty and filial piety, pictures depicting the life stories of renowned scholars, and depictions of a carp jumping up from the river to transform into a dragon symbolizing the aspiration for distinguished academic achievement and a successful career in officialdom.

=== Decorative Painting ===
The vast majority of ancient folk paintings were used for decorative purposes. These paintings generally repeat popular motifs with relatively poor techniques, but attest to the nation's religious tradition harmonizing various faiths such as shamanism, Taoism, Buddhism, and Confucianism.

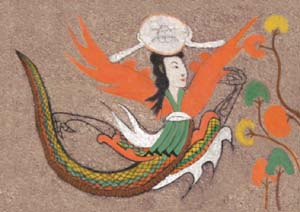
A depiction of the moon goddess from a Goguryeo tomb.

== Goguryeo painters ==
Goguryeo art, preserved largely in tomb paintings, is noted for the vigour of its imagery. Finely detailed art can be seen in Goguryeo tombs and other murals. Many of the art pieces have an original painting style.

Goguryeo tomb murals date from around AD 500 during the Goguryeo period, 37 BC-AD 668. These magnificent, still strongly colored murals show daily life and Korean mythologies of the time. By 2005, 70 murals had been found, mostly in the Taedong river basin near Pyongyang, the Anak area in South Hwanghae Province.

== Goryeo Dynasty ==
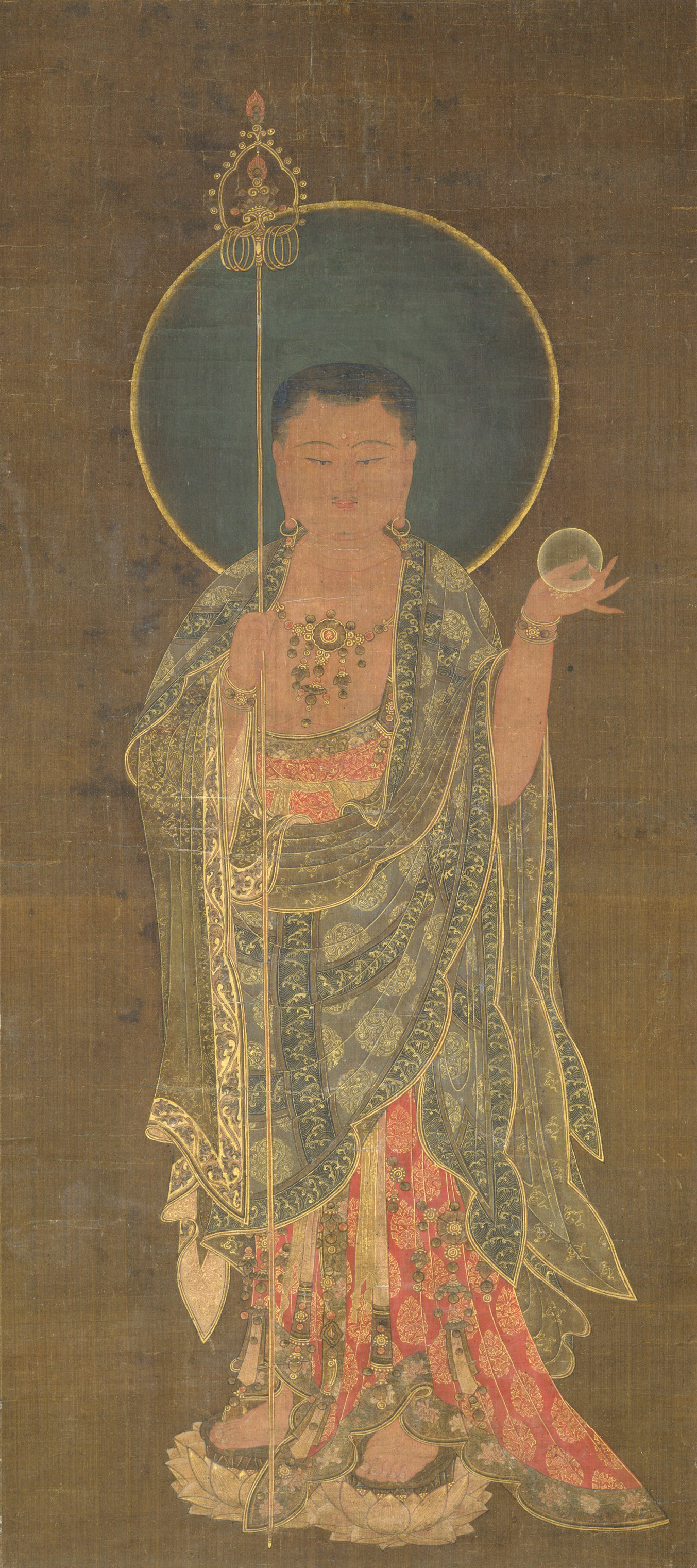
Ksitigarbha, Goryeo Dynasty (918–1392); 1st half of 14c.

During the Goryeo dynasty, exceptionally beautiful paintings were produced in the service of Buddhism; paintings of the bodhisattva Avalokiteshvara (Korean: Gwaneum Bosal) are especially noted for their elegance and spirituality. The patronage of the Goryeo's leading families resulted in the production of high quality Buddhist paintings, such as refined, detailed paintings of Buddhist saints or monks.

King Gongmin of Goryeo (1330–1374) was a significant painter of the period. Yi Nyeong, a court painter, and Yi Chehyŏn, a scholar-painter, are considered significant Goryeo artists outside of the Buddhist tradition.

== Joseon Dynasty ==
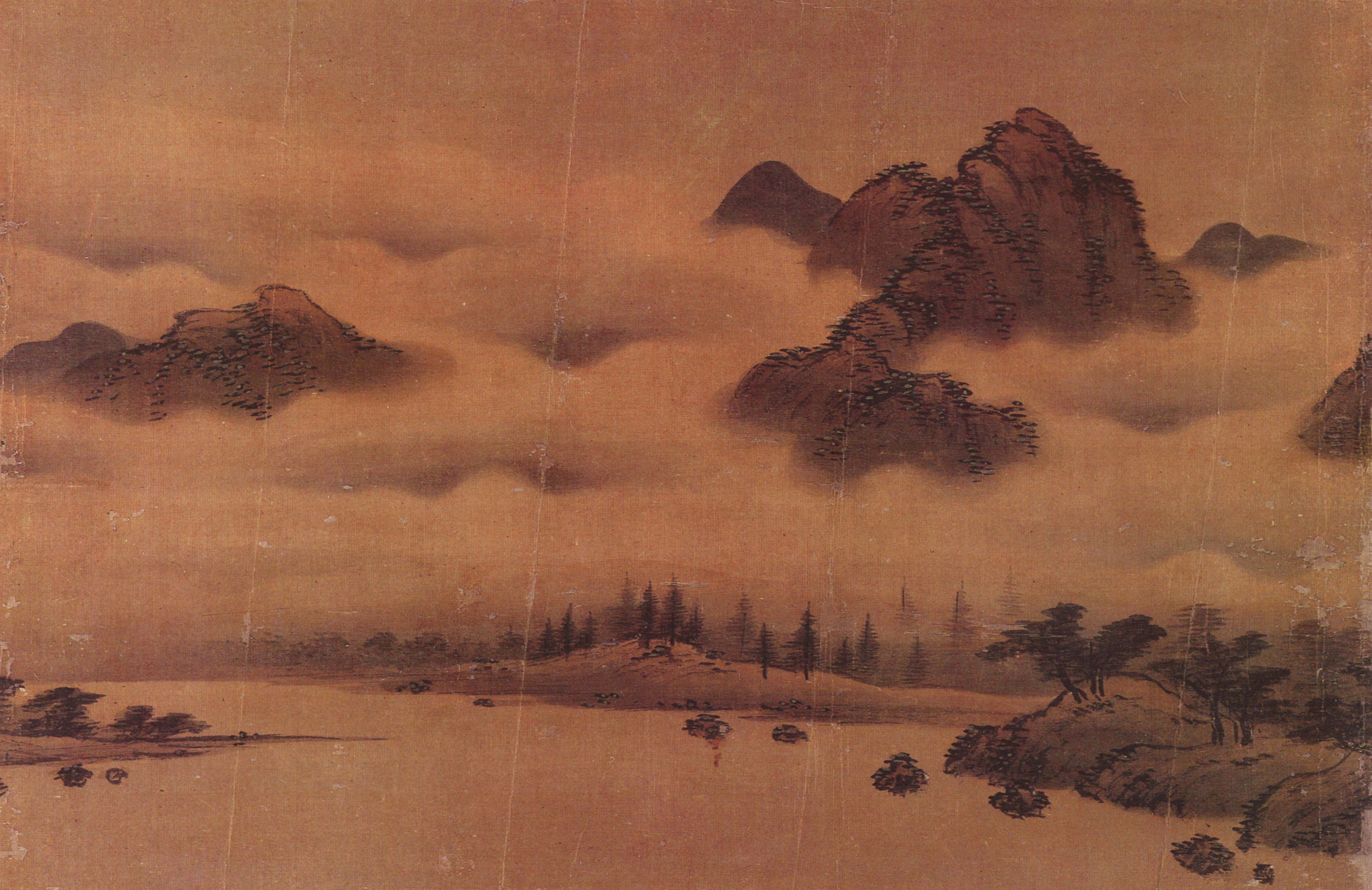
Early Joseon landscape painting by Sŏ Munbo in the late 15th century.

The influence of Confucianism superseded that of Buddhism in this period, but Buddhist elements remained. Buddhist art continued and was encouraged, but not by the royal centres of art or the accepted taste of the Joseon Dynasty publicly. In private homes, and indeed in the summer palaces of the Joseon Dynasty kings, the simplicity of Buddhist art enjoyed great appreciation, but it was not considered sophisticated art.

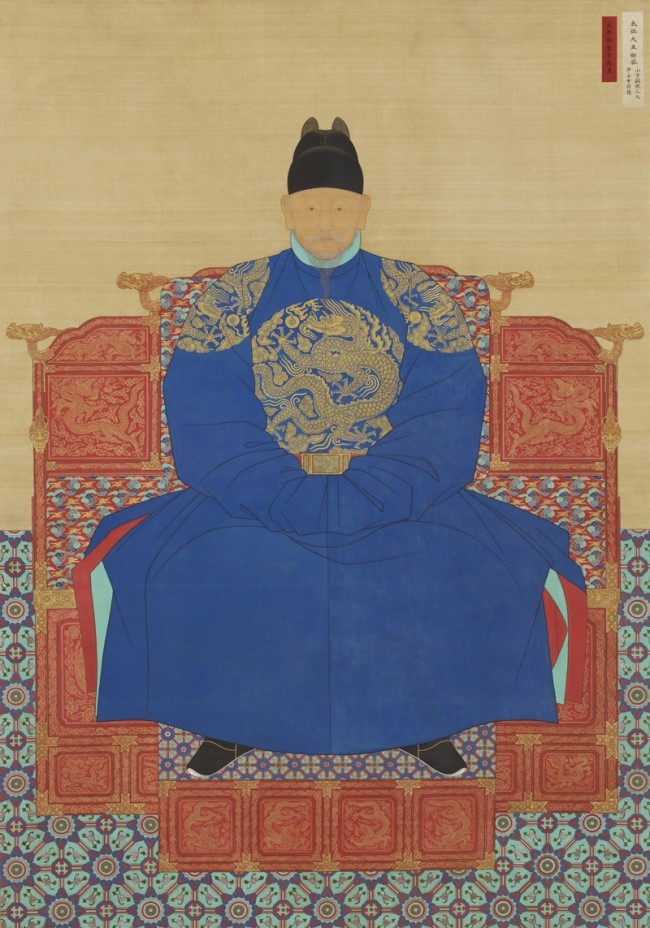
Portrait (어진, Oejin) of King Taejo of Joseon. Ink and colors on silk, 150cm wide and 218cm high. King Taejo had a total of 26 official portraits enshrined in many parts of his kingdom.

During the transitional period leading into the Joseon dynasty, some Korean Buddhist painters left for Japan. Yi Su-mun (1400?–1450?), the founder of the Japanese Soga school, was a boat-companion of the older priest-painter, Shubun of Shokokuji, when he returned from Korea to Japan in 1424. Japanese tradition declared that Yi was so skilled after his "Catfish and Gourd" painting that Shogun Yoshimochi named him a son of the legendary Josetsu as an adoptive honorific. Yi painted alongside and influenced the original painters of Japanese Zen art and was known in Japan by his Japanese name, Ri Shubun, or the Korean Shubun. The entire tradition of needle points in Japanese art began with Yi and continued through his students, known as the Soga School, a more naturalistic group of artists than the courtly school patronized by the Ashikaga shoguns.

While the Joseon Dynasty began under military auspices, Goryeo styles were left to evolve, and Buddhist iconography (bamboo, orchid, plum and chrysanthemum, and the familiar knotted good luck symbols) was still a part of genre paintings. Neither colours nor forms underwent any real change, and rulers stood aside from edicts on art. Ming ideals and imported techniques continued in early dynasty idealized works. Early dynasty painters include An Gyeon, a 15th-century painter.

Mid-dynasty painting styles moved towards increased realism. A national painting style of landscapes called "true view" began – moving from the traditional Chinese style of idealized general landscapes to exactly rendered, specific locations. While not photographic, the style was academic enough to become established and supported as a standardized style in Korean painting. Mid-dynasty painters include Hwang Jipjung (born 1533).

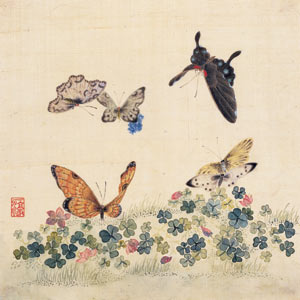
Hwajeopdo, literally picture of flowers and butterflies drawn by a Joseon painter, Nam Kyeu.

The mid to late Joseon dynasty is considered the golden age of Korean painting. It coincided with the shock of the collapse of the Ming dynasty and links with the Manchu emperors' accession in China, which forced Korean artists to create new artistic models based on nationalism and an inner search for peculiarly Korean subjects. At this time, China ceased to have pre-eminent influence. Korean art took its own course and became increasingly distinctive.

Genre paintings of the late Joseon Dynasty Era and true-view landscape paintings have become celebrated and emblematic; however, they also show the unassuming reality of the Korean people and their lives--not only those who hold high positions of power, but also those who work under them: the commoners or lower classes and seemingly even women (Park J.P., 2018). In modern Korea, these paintings are preserved as mementos that show the late Joseon Dynasty's thriving society. They are believed to have projected an uncomplicated, nostalgia-producing past. The master works created by Kim Hongdo (1745 – c. 1810) and Sin Yunbok (1758 –?) are promoted as art that describes the state, people, and history of Korea. The effort required to execute these paintings shows the academic attention invested toward understanding the Korean past. The Korean viewer is socially expected to share this motivation, and the art of Korea has become an integral part of pursuing knowledge of Korea and its history.

Because the effort put into the artwork nurtured the popularization of these paintings, some modern studies relate the historical particularities of the time, such as the cultural and ideological landscape, to the artists’ motivation and inspiration. These studies include theories of how they became popular at the time of their creation. Some suggest that Korean genre paintings were a product of those earlier Koreans' pride on realizing that their own culture was a legitimate heir to China's high civilization (Park J.P., 2018). As late Confucian civilization faded and the Ming fell in mainland China, the late Joseon-era artists sought to capture and define the values of Joseon Korea's landscape and society in these new paintings (Park J.P., 2018). Another viewpoint would be an interpretive approach toward the era's escalating interest in learning, which provided Joseon-era artists with the motivation and inspiration to view scenes of Korean daily life and changes in the social landscape from a new perspective. As Joseon artists put more time into pursuing academic practical studies, the people and their lives became a key factor contributing to their artwork and their determination to observe and depict the people they encountered around them.

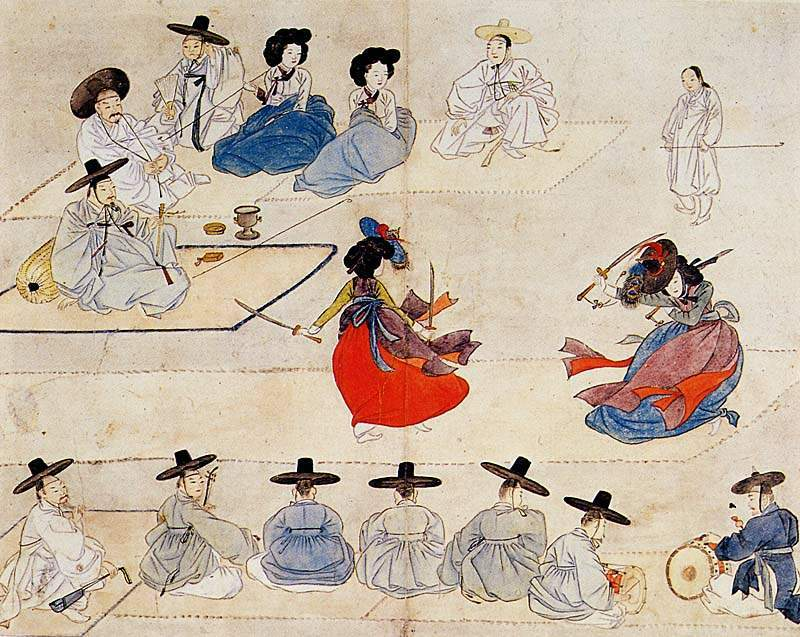
"Dancing together holding with two swords" from Hyewon pungsokdo depicting geommu (sword dance) performing during Joseon dynasty

Among many artists of the mid- to late-Joseon era who painted quotidian scenes of the Korean people, one yangban artist, Yun Tusŏ (1668–1715), stood out as a founding father of this genre. Yun Tusŏ created many drawings and paintings based on the labors, behaviors, leisure, and emotions of the common people that he observed around him. This emphasis was unprecedented at that time and became extremely popular. The subjects of these artworks became primary motifs, rather than decorative additions as in previous eras. What calligraphy is used is often discreetly done.

The most notable major painters include:

- Chŏng Sŏn (1676–1759), a literati painter influenced by the Wu school of the Ming dynasty in China and especially by the Diamond mountain landscape.
- Yun Tusŏ (1668–1715), a portraitist.
- Kim Hongdo (1745–c. 1806) aka Tanwŏn (his art name), created highly coloured, crowded scenes of common, working-class people in many natural work activities. His paintings have a postcard realism in a palette of whites, blues, and greens. There is little if any calligraphy in his works. Their humour and variety of gestures and movement are often imitated even today.
- Sin Yunbok (1758–?) aka Hyewŏn, a court painter often depicted the scholarly or yangban classes in motion through stylized natural settings; he is known for his strong reds and blues and his grayish mountainscapes.
- Chang Sŭngŏp (1843–1897) aka Owŏn, was a painter of the Korean late Joseon Dynasty and one of three great wŏns of Joseon Korea.

Other important artists of the "literati school" include:

- Yi Kyong-yun
- Kang Sehwang

Chaekgeori is a genre of still-life painting from the Joseon period that features books as the dominant subject. Chaekgeori flourished from the second half of the 18th to the first half of the 20th century and was enjoyed by all members of the population, from the king to the commoners, revealing the Korean infatuation with books and learning.

=== Gallery ===
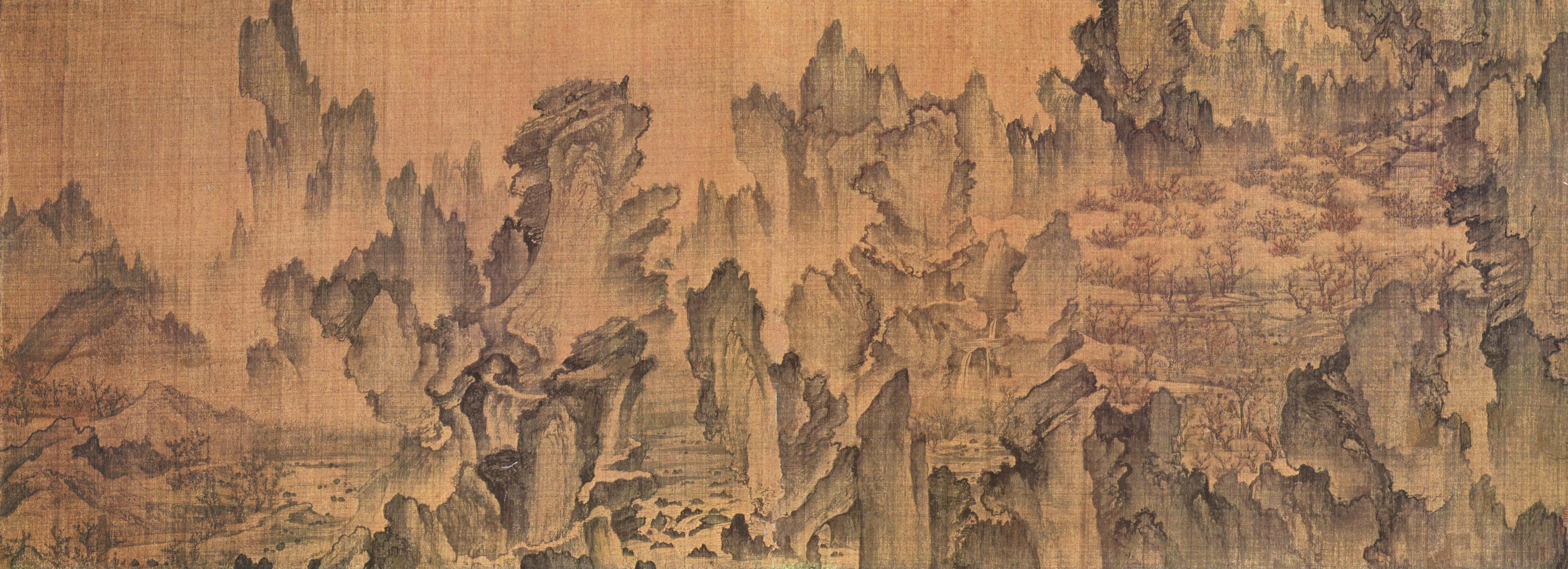
An Kyŏn, Dream Journey to the Peach Blossom Land, 1447, Tenri University Central Library.

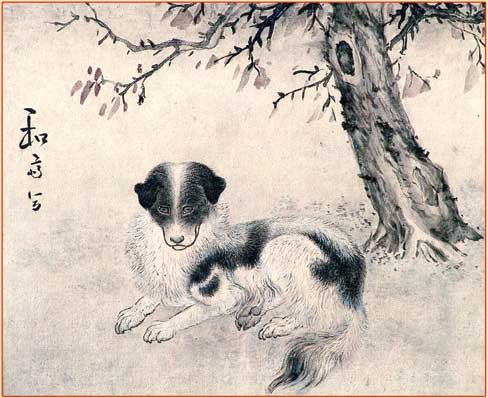
Pyŏn Sangbyŏk (1730–?), Gyeondo (painting of a dog). 18th century, Joseon Korea.

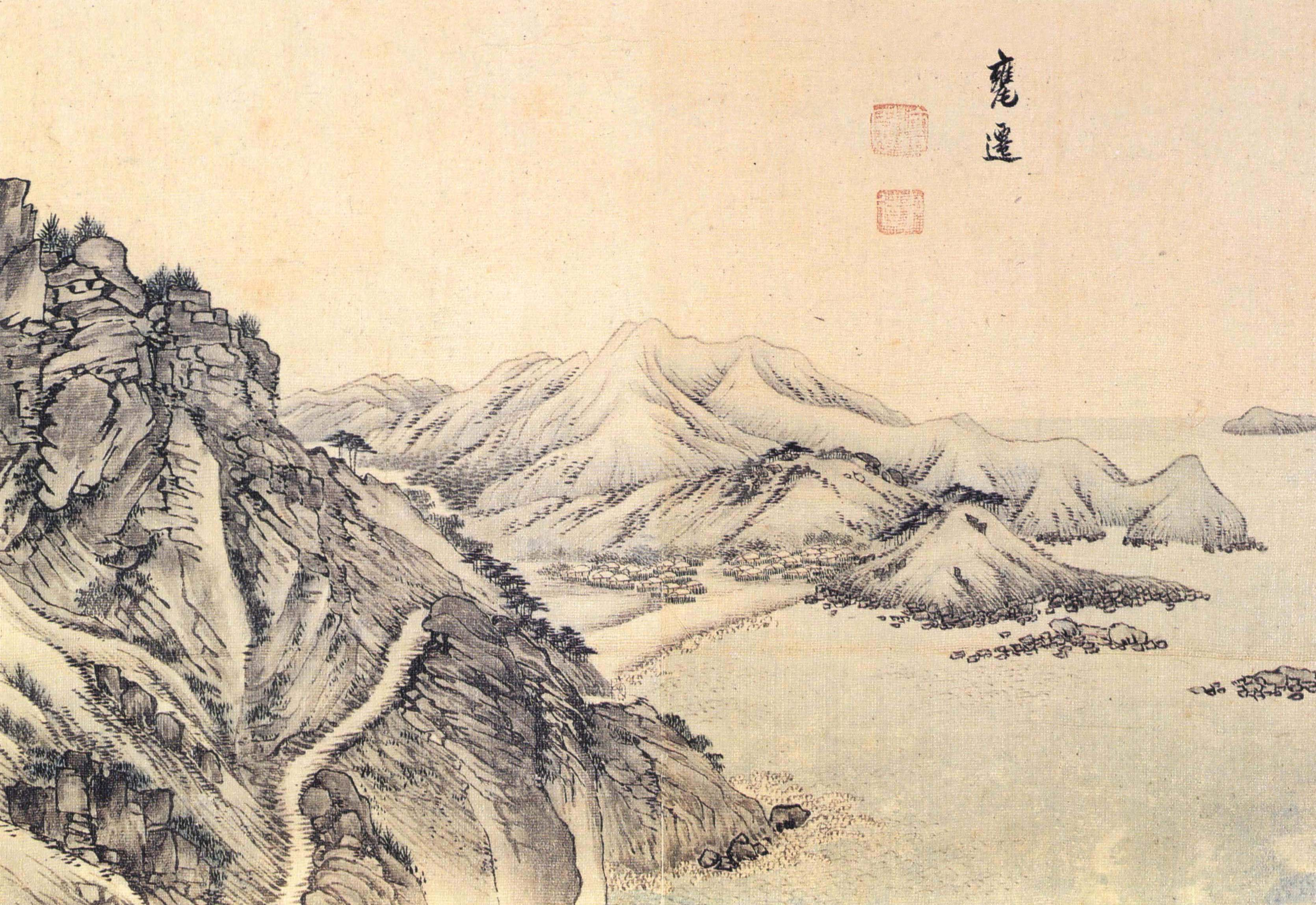
Kim Hongdo, Four Districts of Mount Geumgang, 1788, Landscape of Mt. Geumgang.

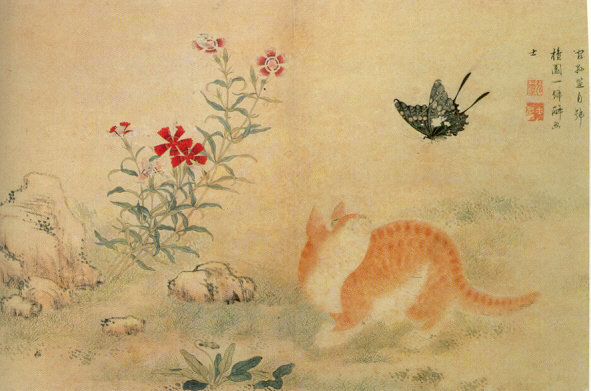
Kim Hongdo, A Cat and a Butterfly, 18th century, Gansong Art Gallery.

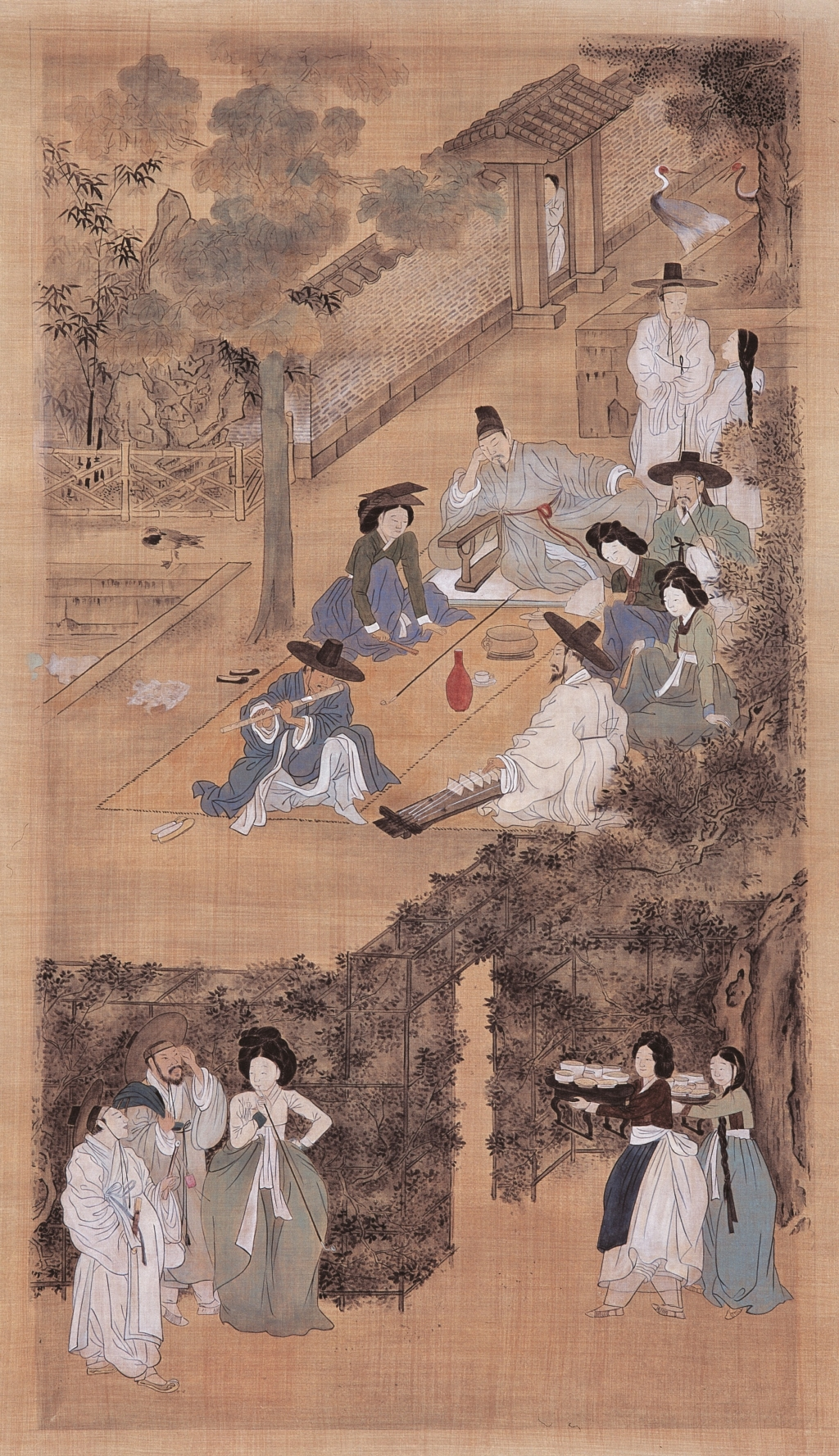
Kim Hongdo, A musical party, start of 19th century.

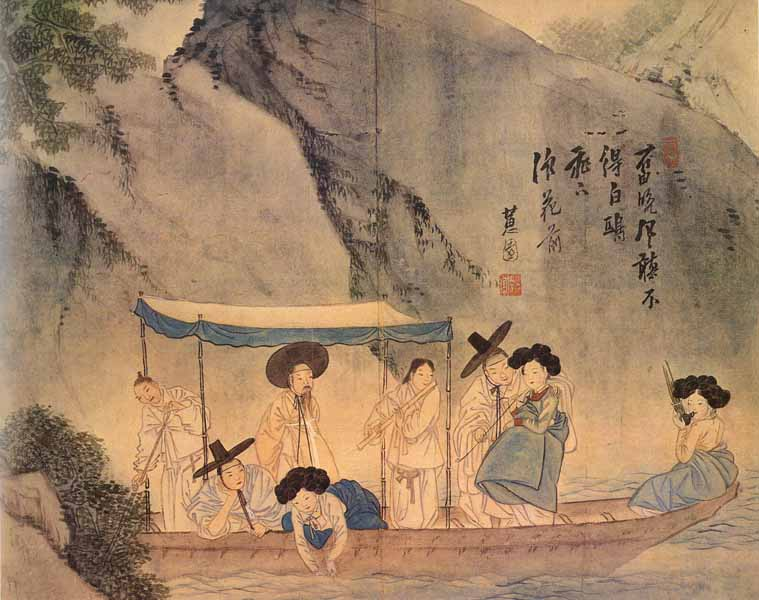
Sin Yunbok (1758–?), A Boat Ride, 1805, Gansong Art Gallery.

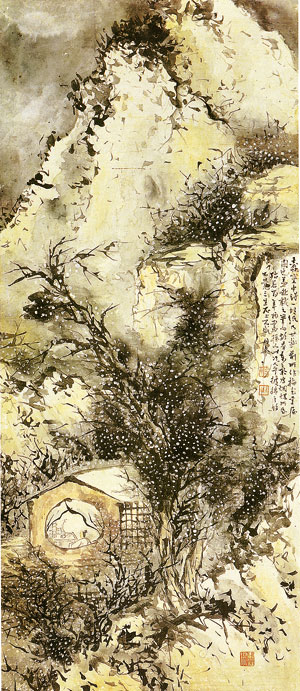
Cho Hŭiryong (1797–1859), A House amongst Apricot Trees, Gansong Art Gallery.

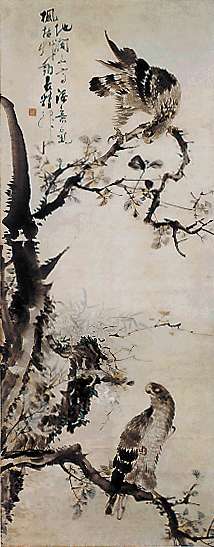
Chang Sŭngŏp (1843–1897), Hochwido (painting of a hawk)

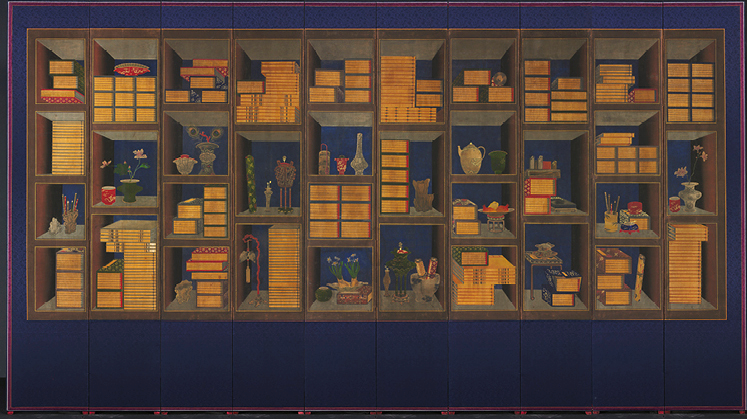
Chaekgeori

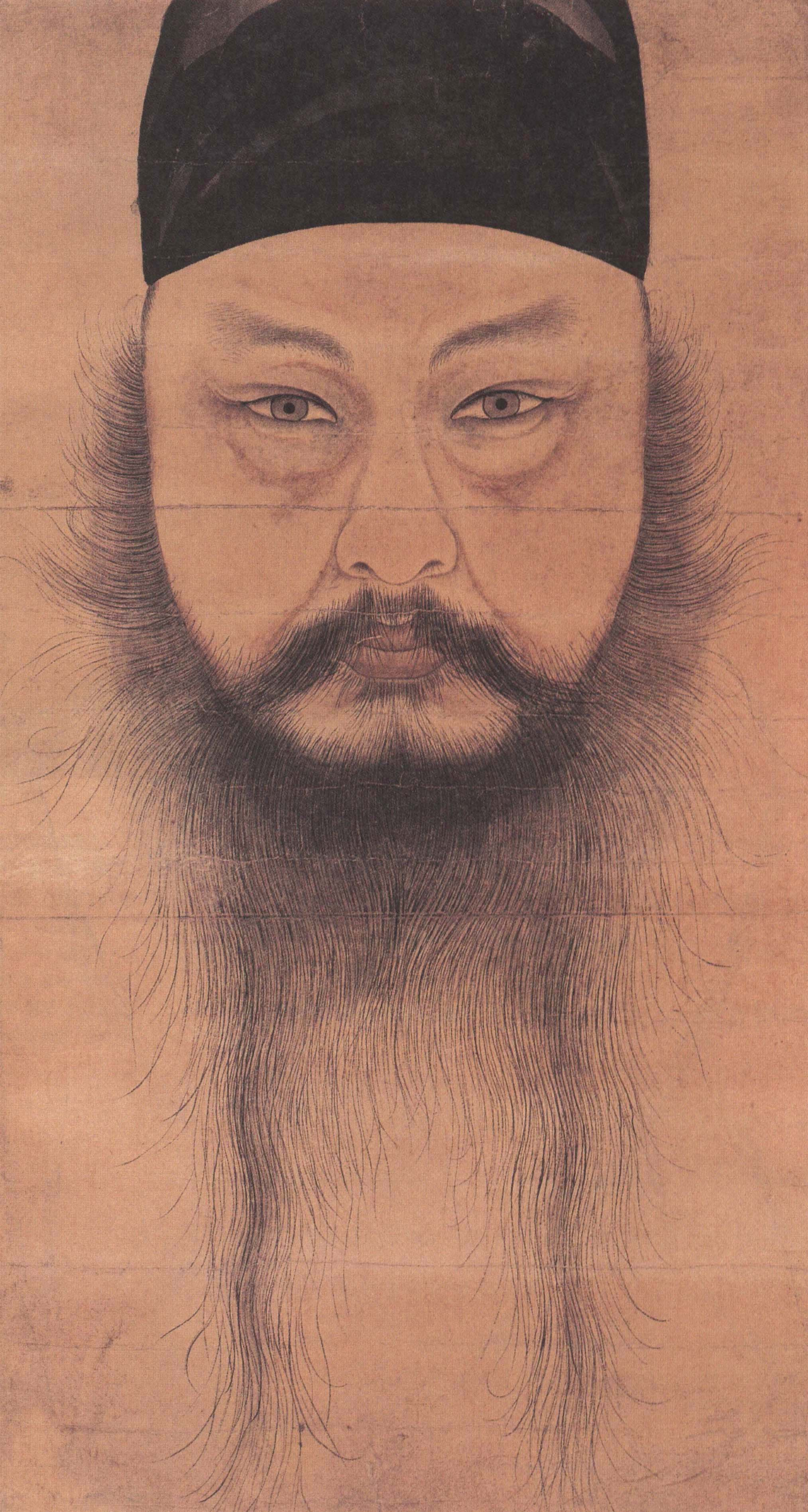
Self-portrait of Yun Tusŏ, 1710

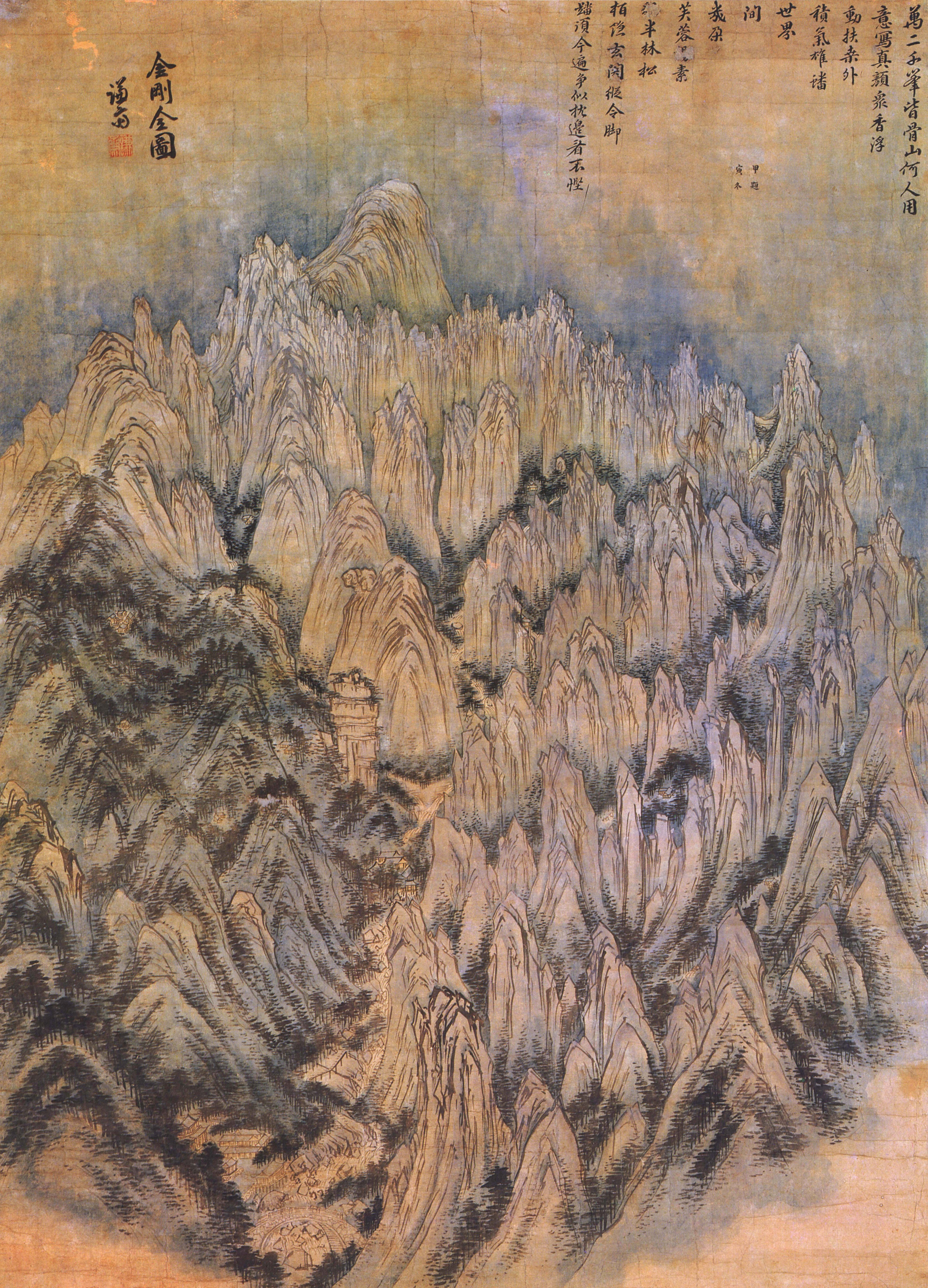
Geumgang jeondo by Chŏng Sŏn, 1734

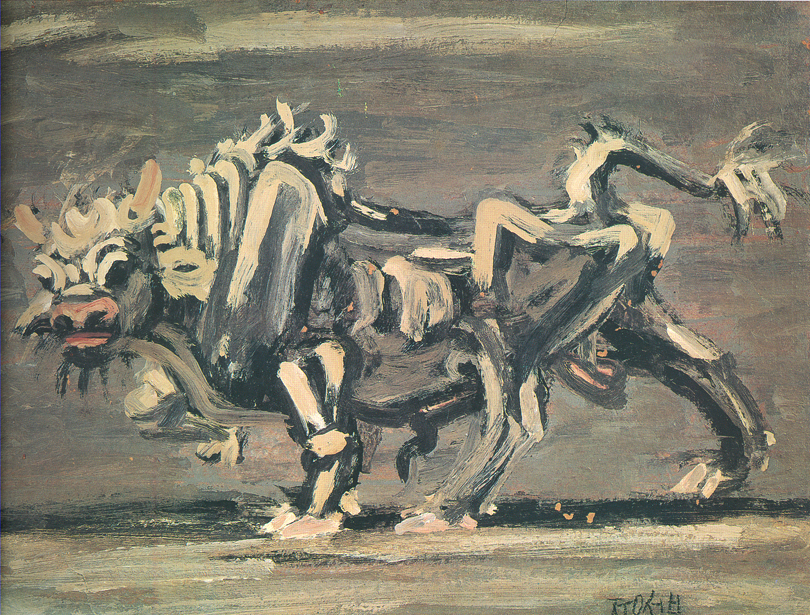
White Ox by Lee Jung-seob, 1954

== Artists during the Japanese occupation ==
Korean artists from the middle 1880s until 1945 had a very difficult time before Korea was freed by the allies after Japan's unconditional surrender.

From the 1880s onward, the emerging popularity of western art in Japan led to a low opinion of traditional Korean art. Nevertheless, the formation of the Korean Crafts Museum in 1924, by Japanese philosopher Yanagi Sōetsu, indicates that some Japanese aesthetes still appreciated Korean art.

In 1921, Korean painters established the Society Exhibition to promote Korean art. A year later, the Japanese colonial government under Governor-General Saitō Makoto also established an official exhibition of Korean art in the style of the Imperial Exhibition in Japan (which in turn was modeled after the official Salon in France). As a result, the Society Exhibition declined throughout the 1930s as the official exhibition grew in popularity. The exhibition produced many young Korean artists such as Park Su-geun. To date no retrospective show has ever been held of the hidden art created under Japanese occupation, nor any discussion of the conflicts within those who were forced into artistic compromise under Japanese demands. The issue is sensitive, with artists who studied and worked in Japan and painted in the Japanese style forced into self-defense and justification of compromise without other alternatives.

Bridging the late Joseon dynasty and the Japanese occupation period were noteworthy artists such as Chi Un-Yeong (1853–1936).

== Major 20th-century Korean artists ==
Colour theory has been emphasized over formal perspective, and since the primary influence on painters is Korean pottery, there has yet to be an overlap between painterly art and pop-graphics.

- Kim Tschang-yeul
- Park Su-geun
- Nam June Paik
- Chang Ucchin
- Seund Ja Rhee
- Lee Jung-seob
- Lee Ufan

== New wave ==
- Lee Dong Youb
- Suh Yongsun

== 21st-century Korean artists ==
- Haegue Yang
- Choi Jeong Hwa
- Amy Sol
- David Choe
- Seonna Hong
- Tschoon Su Kim
- Junggeun Oh
- Kim Sang-soon
