= Lacquerware =

Objects decoratively covered with lacquer

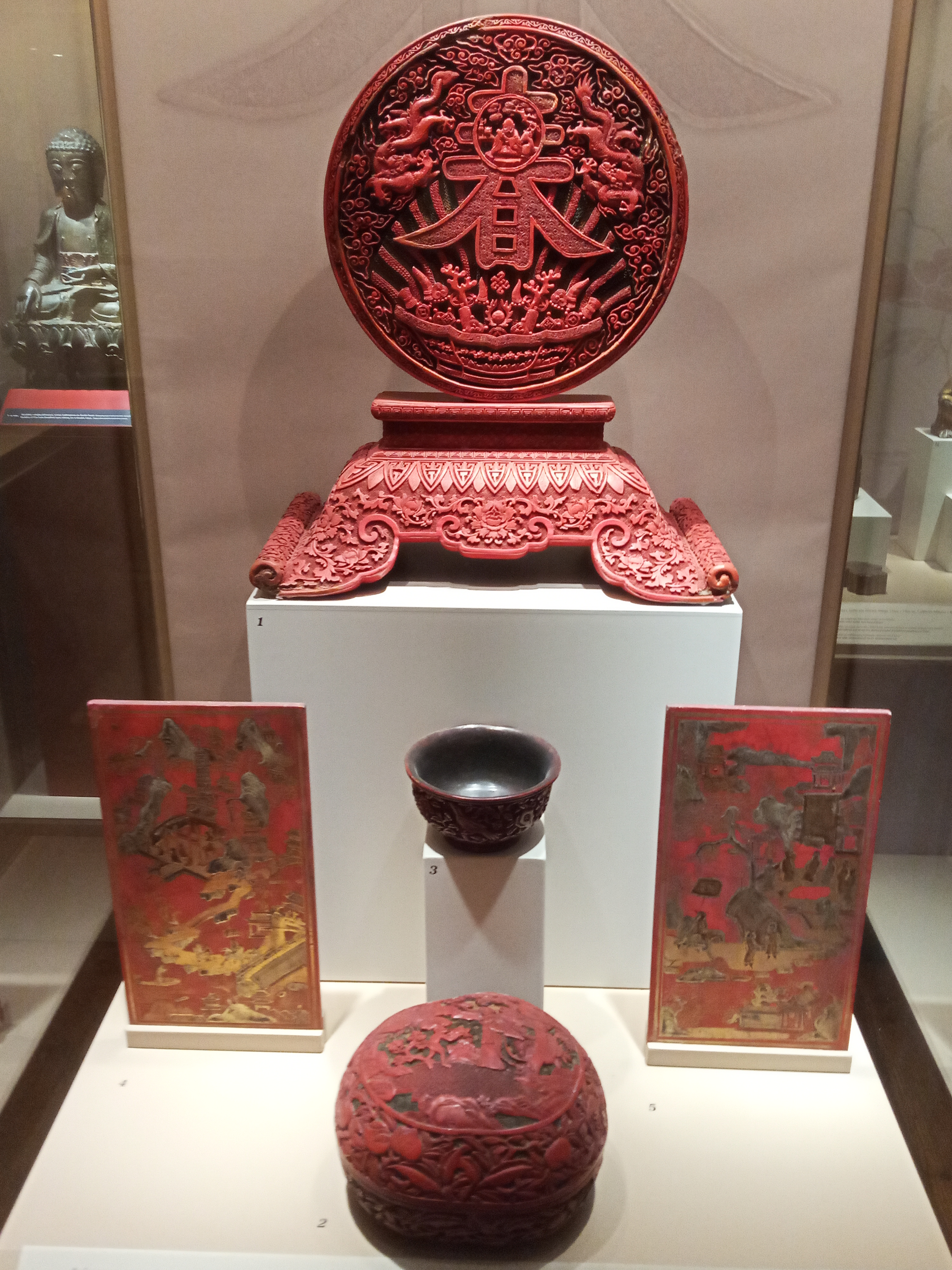
Lacquerware collection, China, Qing dynasty

Lacquerware are objects decoratively covered with lacquer. Lacquerware includes small or large containers, tableware, miscellaneous lacquered small objects carried by people, and larger objects such as furniture and even coffins painted with lacquer. Before lacquering, the surface is sometimes painted with pictures, inlaid with shell and other materials, or carved. The lacquer can be dusted with gold or silver for example Hirameji and given further decorative treatments.

East Asian countries have long traditions of lacquer work, going back several thousand years in the cases of China, Japan and Korea. The best known lacquer, sometimes referred to as 'true' lacquer, is an urushiol-based lacquer common in East Asia. It is obtained from the dried sap of the lacquer tree, Toxicodendron vernicifluum.

Other types of lacquers are processed from a variety of plants and insects. The traditions of lacquer work in Southeast Asia, South Asia and the Americas are also ancient and originated independently. Attempts to imitate 'true' lacquer of East Asia, such as Japanning in Europe, are often loosely referred to as "imitation lacquer."

== East Asia ==
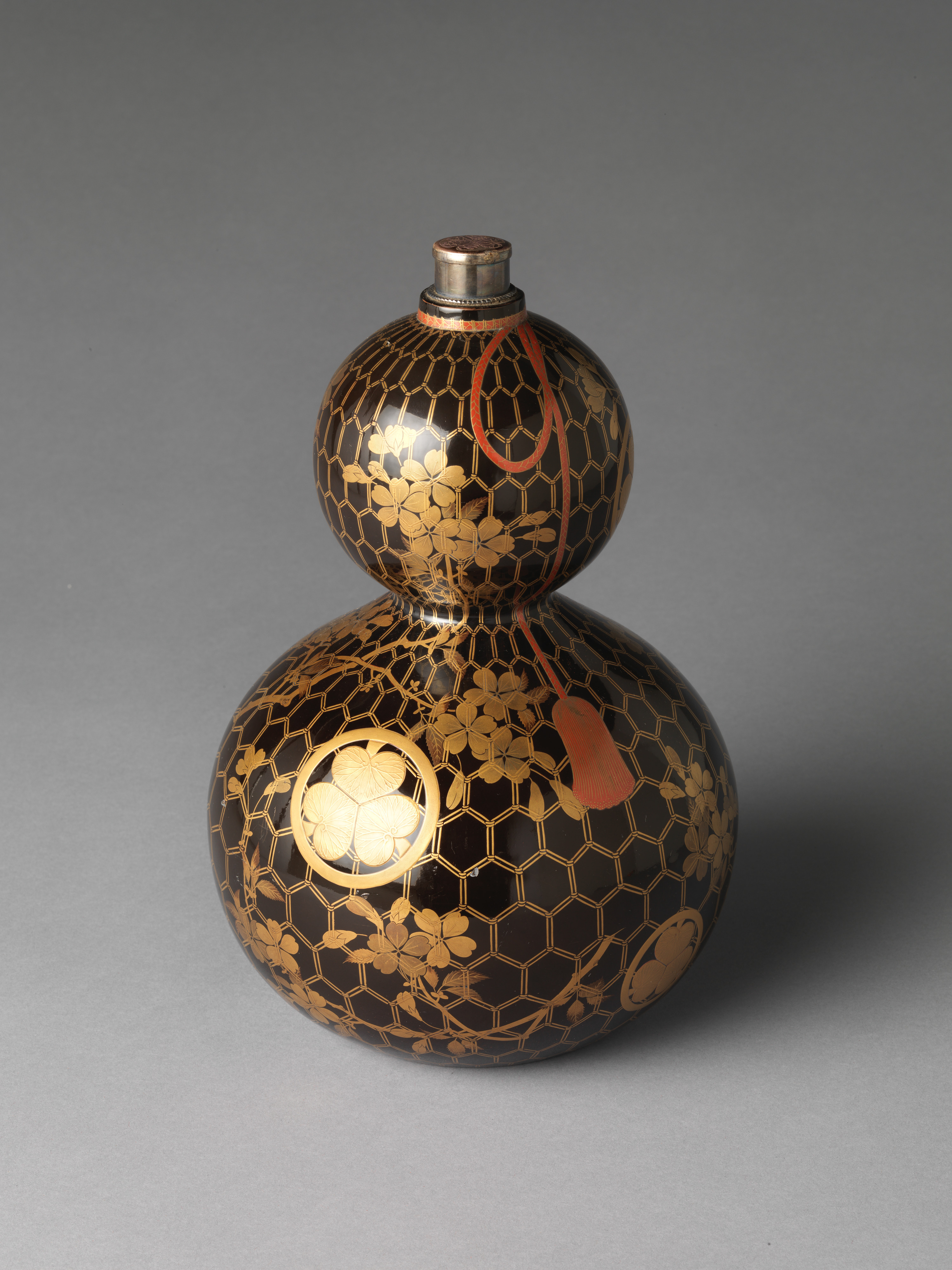
Maki-e sake bottle with Tokugawa clan's mon (emblem), Japan, Edo period.

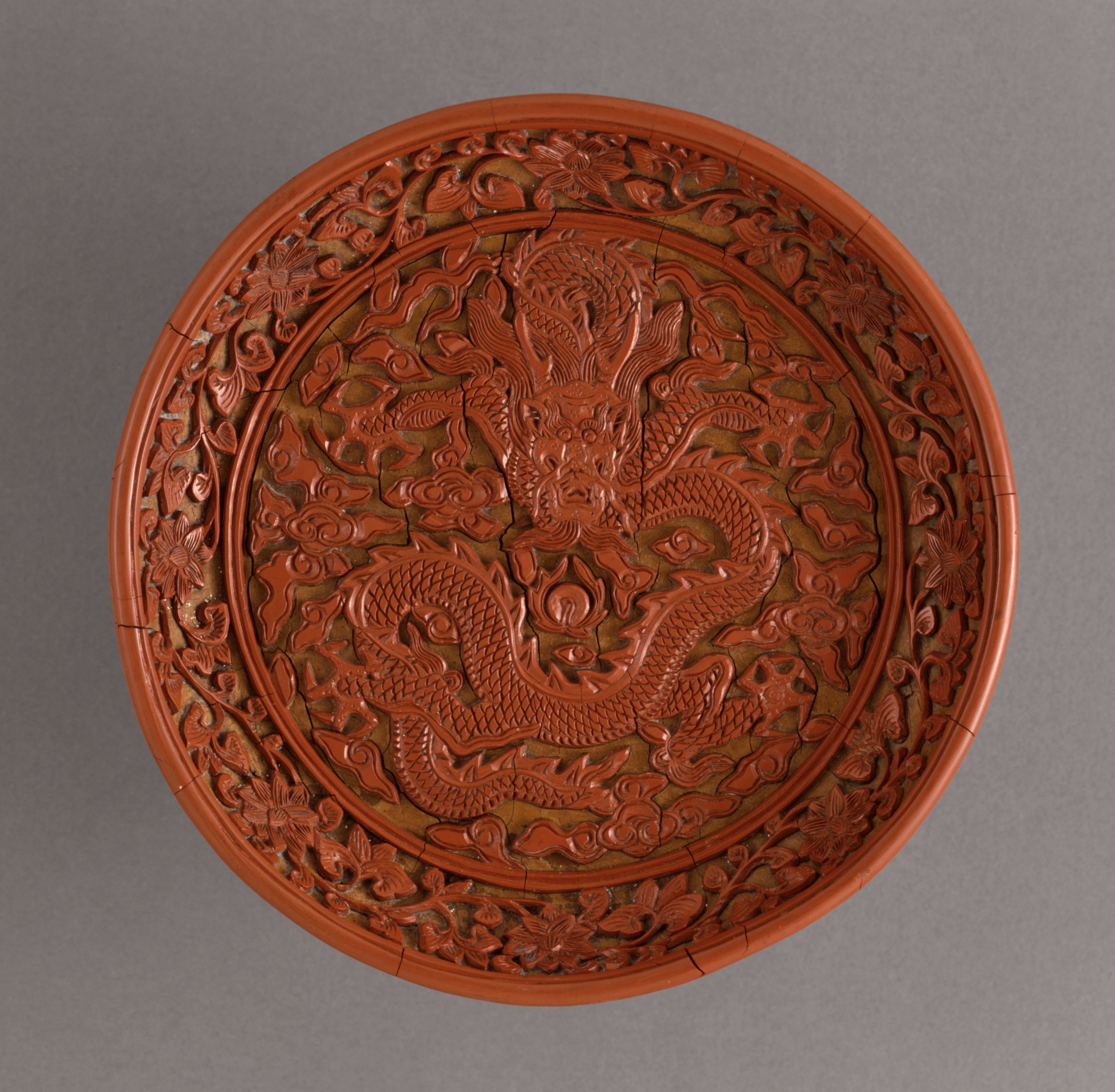
Diaoqi or carved lacquer dish with dragon amid clouds, China, Ming dynasty, Wanli era (1573–1620)

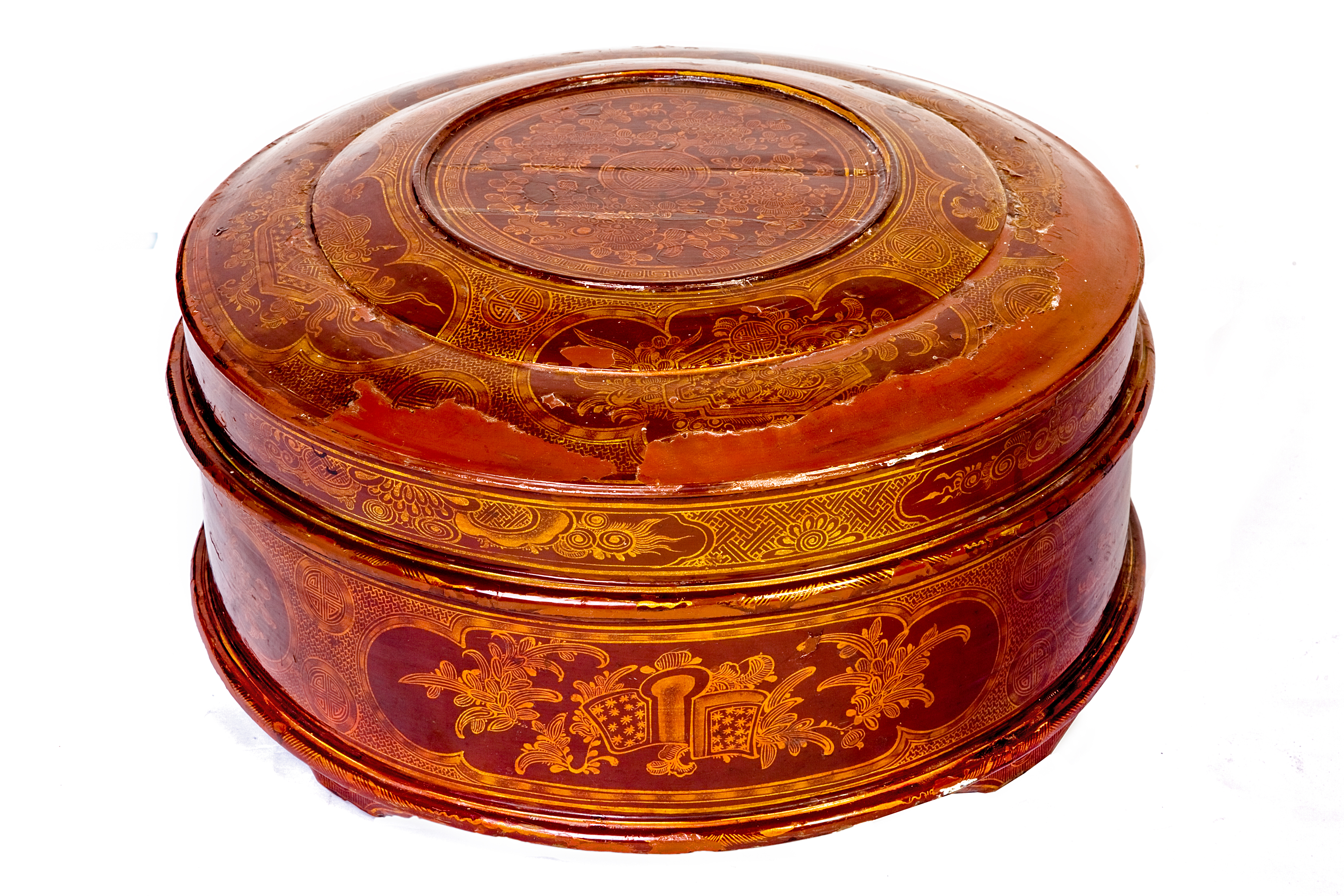
Lacquered betel-tray, Vietnam, Nguyễn dynasty

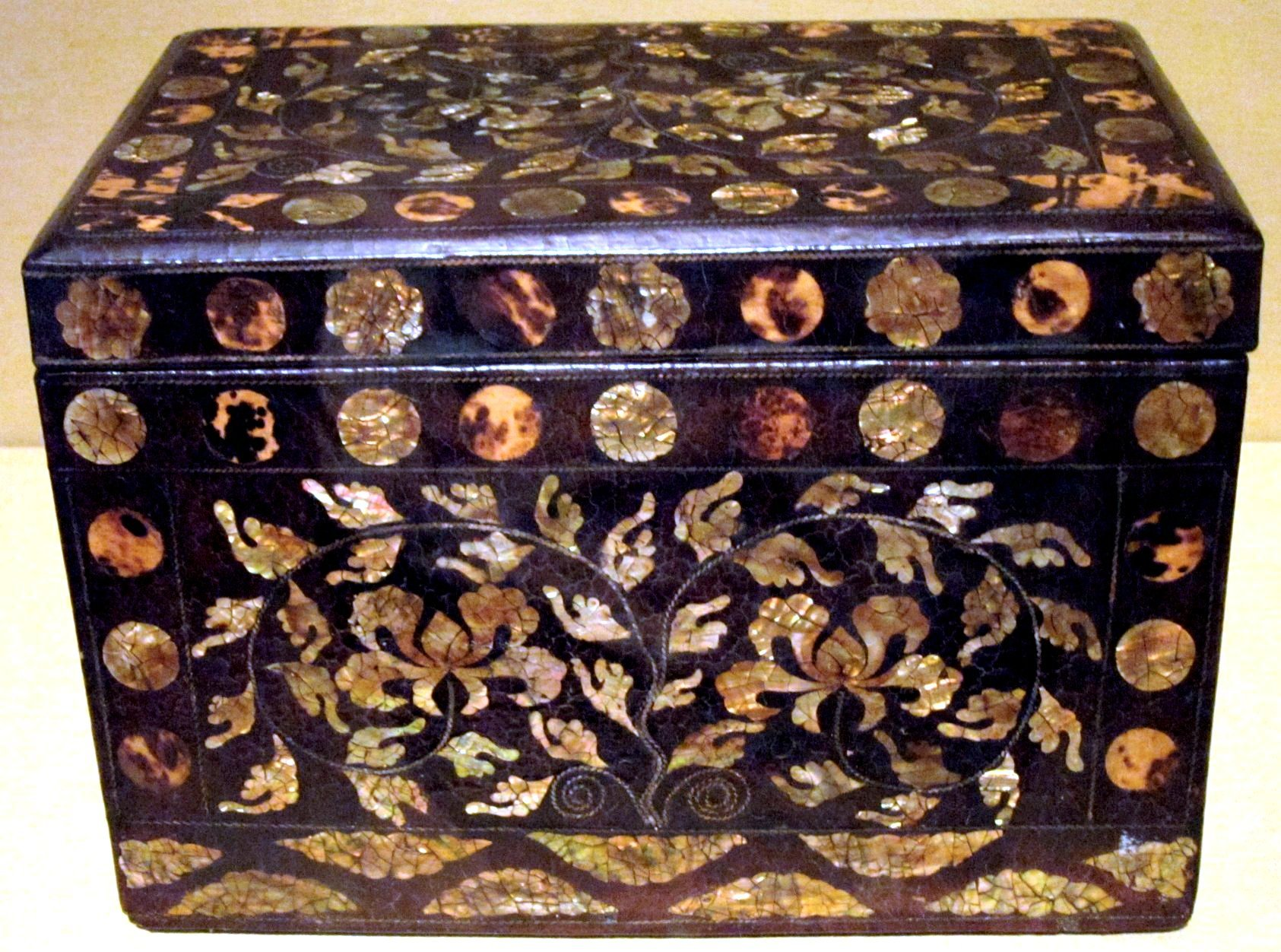
Lacquered box with mother-of-pearl inlays, Korea, Joseon period, mid to late 18th century

The oldest lacquer tree found is from the Jōmon period in Japan, 12600 years ago. The oldest lacquerware in the world, burial ornaments which were created in 9th millennium B.C., were unearthed in early Jomon period tombs, at the Kakinoshima site in Hakodate, Hokkaido, Japan. Various prehistoric lacquerwares have been unearthed in China dating back to the Neolithic period and objects. The earliest known lacquerware in China is thought to be a red wooden bowl, which was unearthed at a Hemudu culture (c. 5th millennium BC) site in Zhejiang, China.

=== Chinese lacquerware ===
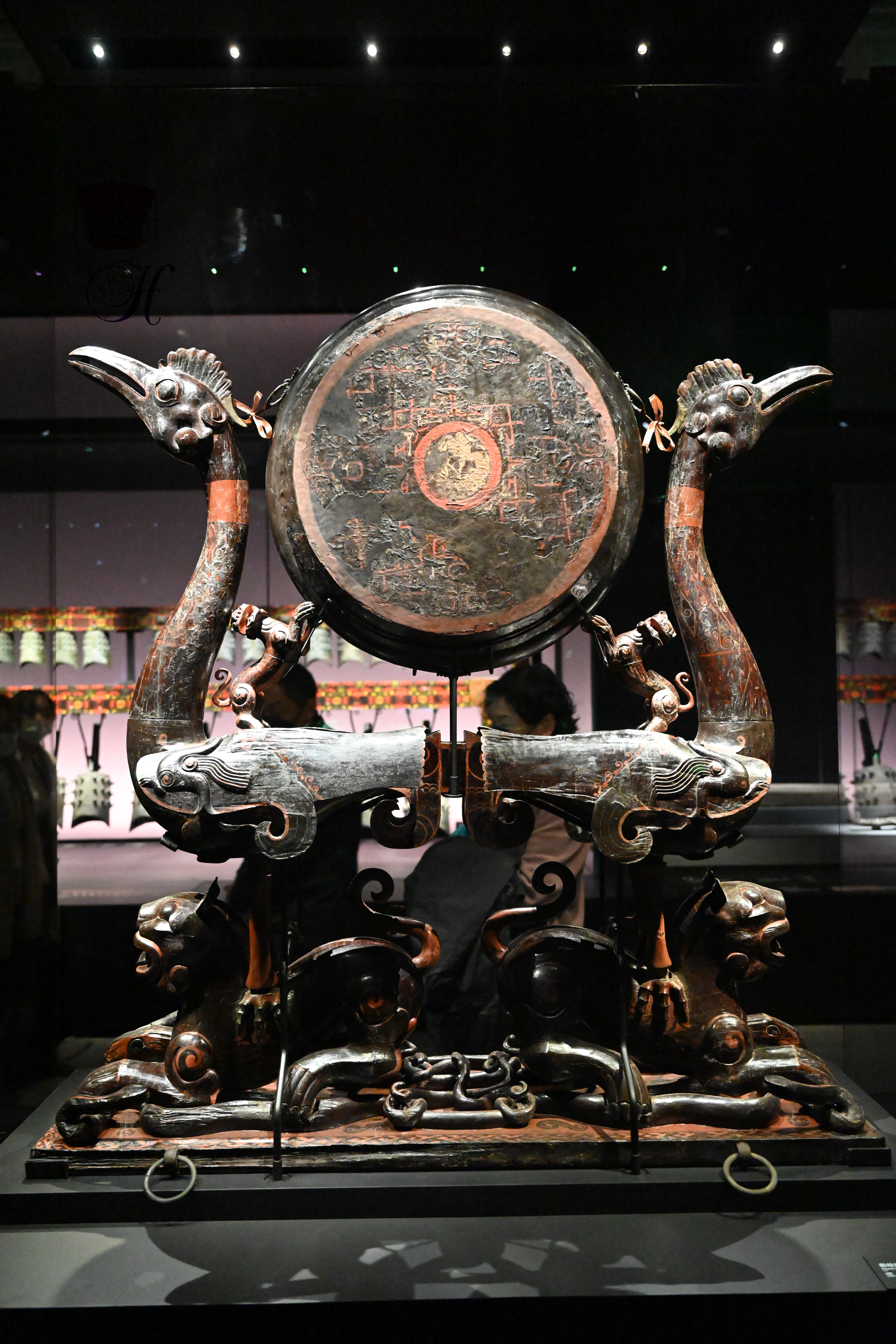
Drum with and Bird and Tiger Frame, Chu-state, Spring and Autumn period.

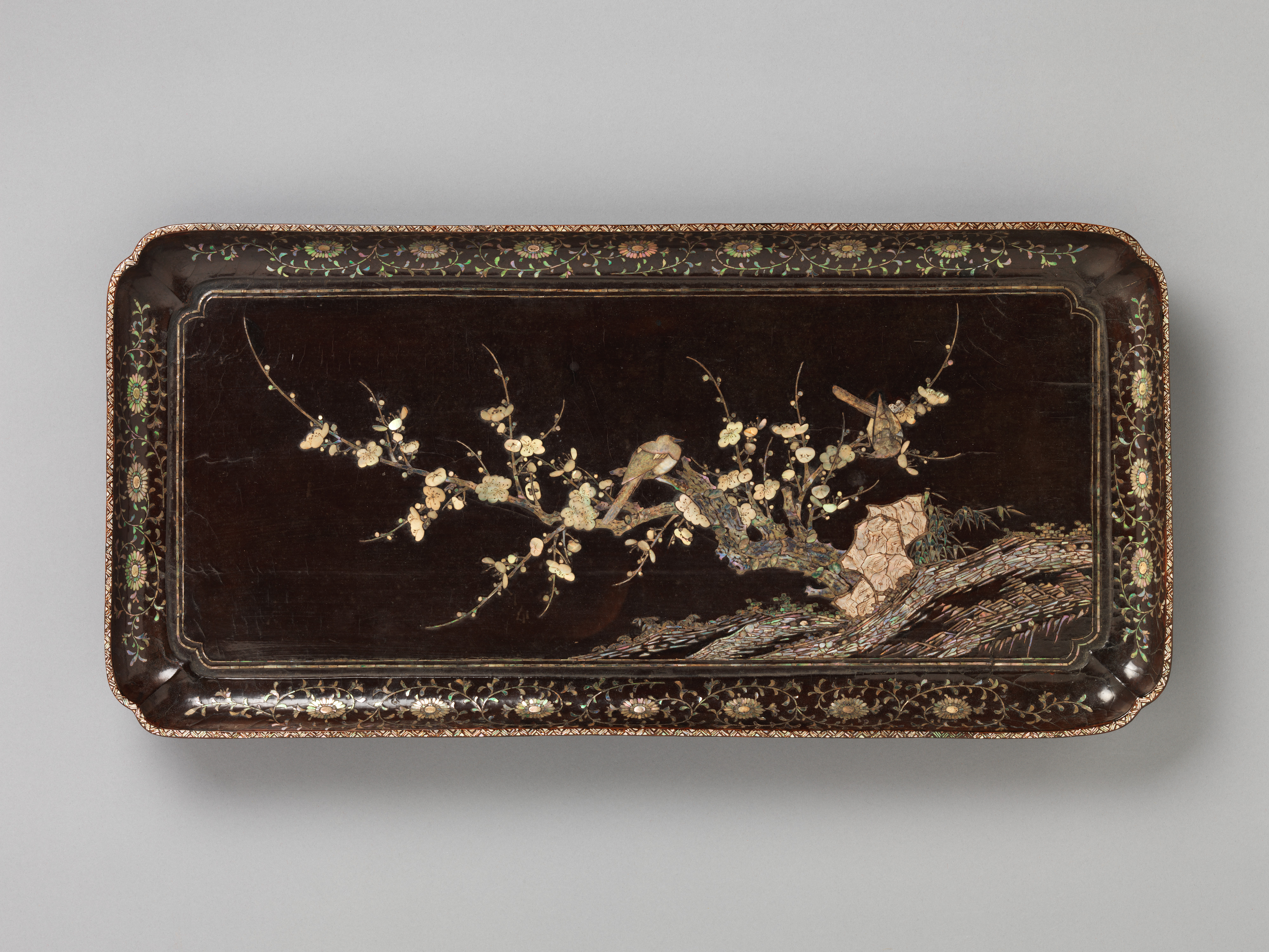
Tray with Flowering Plum and Birds, Late Yuan- Early Ming dynasty

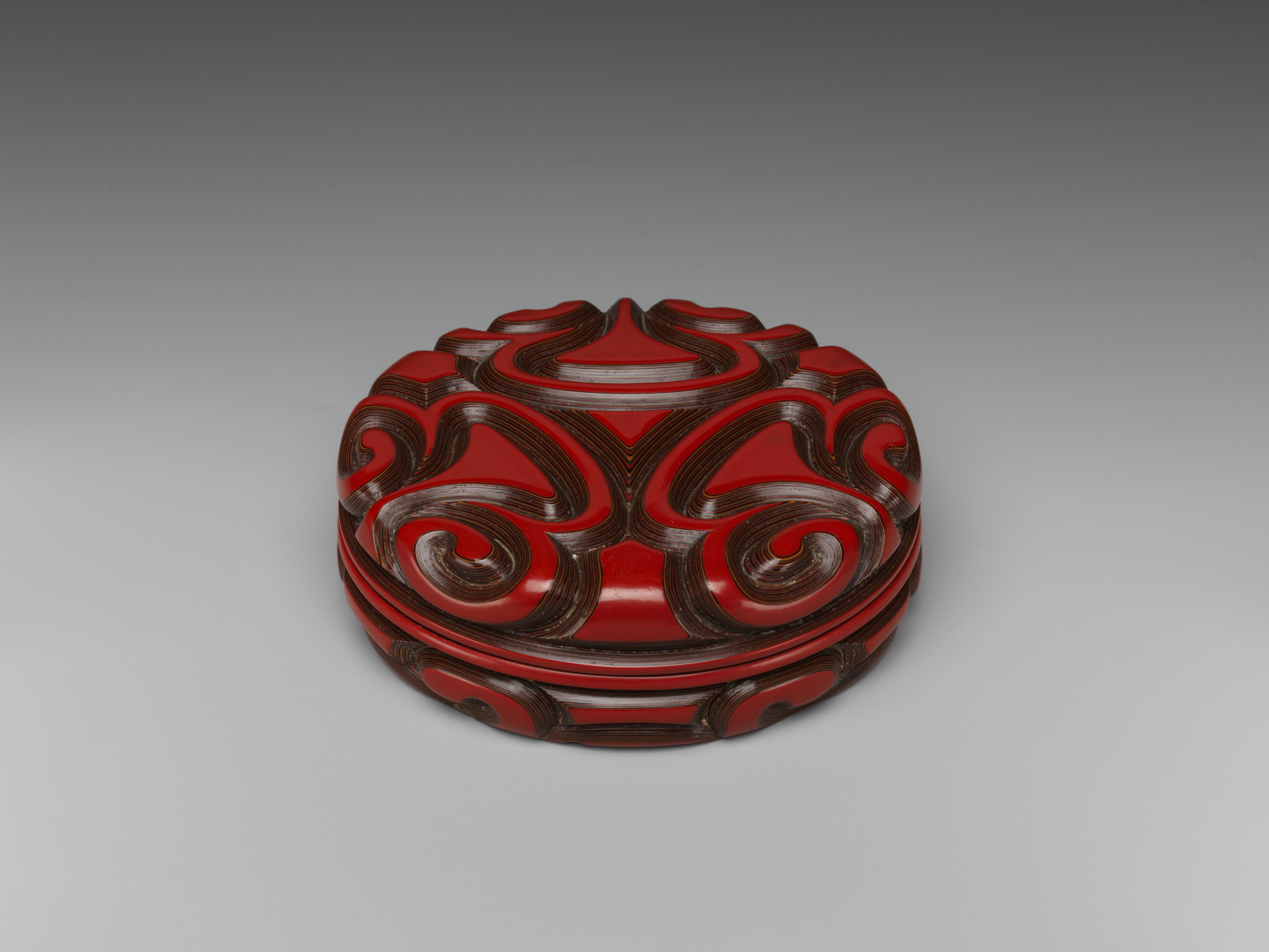
Incense Box with Pommel Scroll Design, Southern Song dynasty

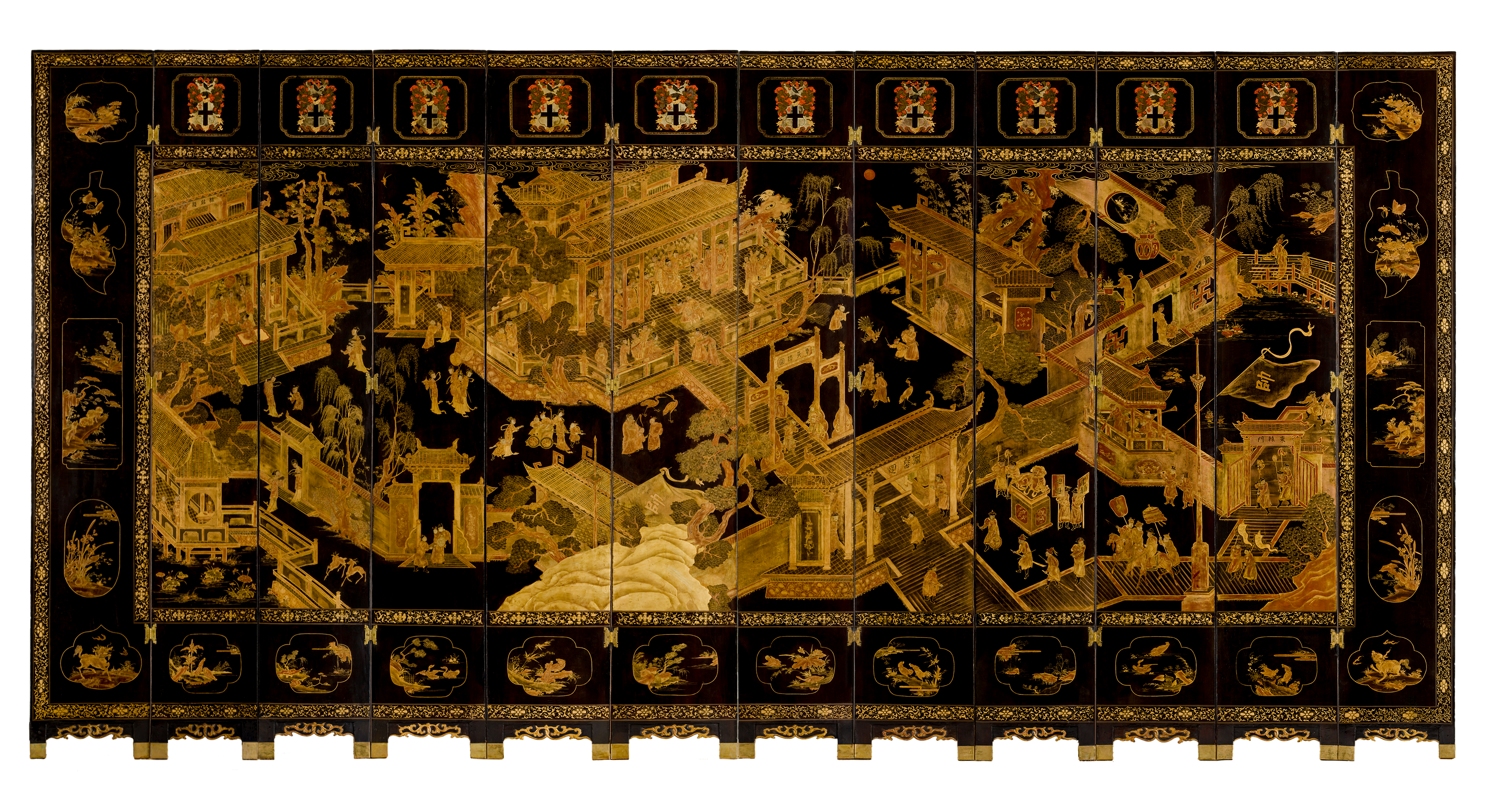
Armorial folding screen, Qing dynasty, 1720–1730

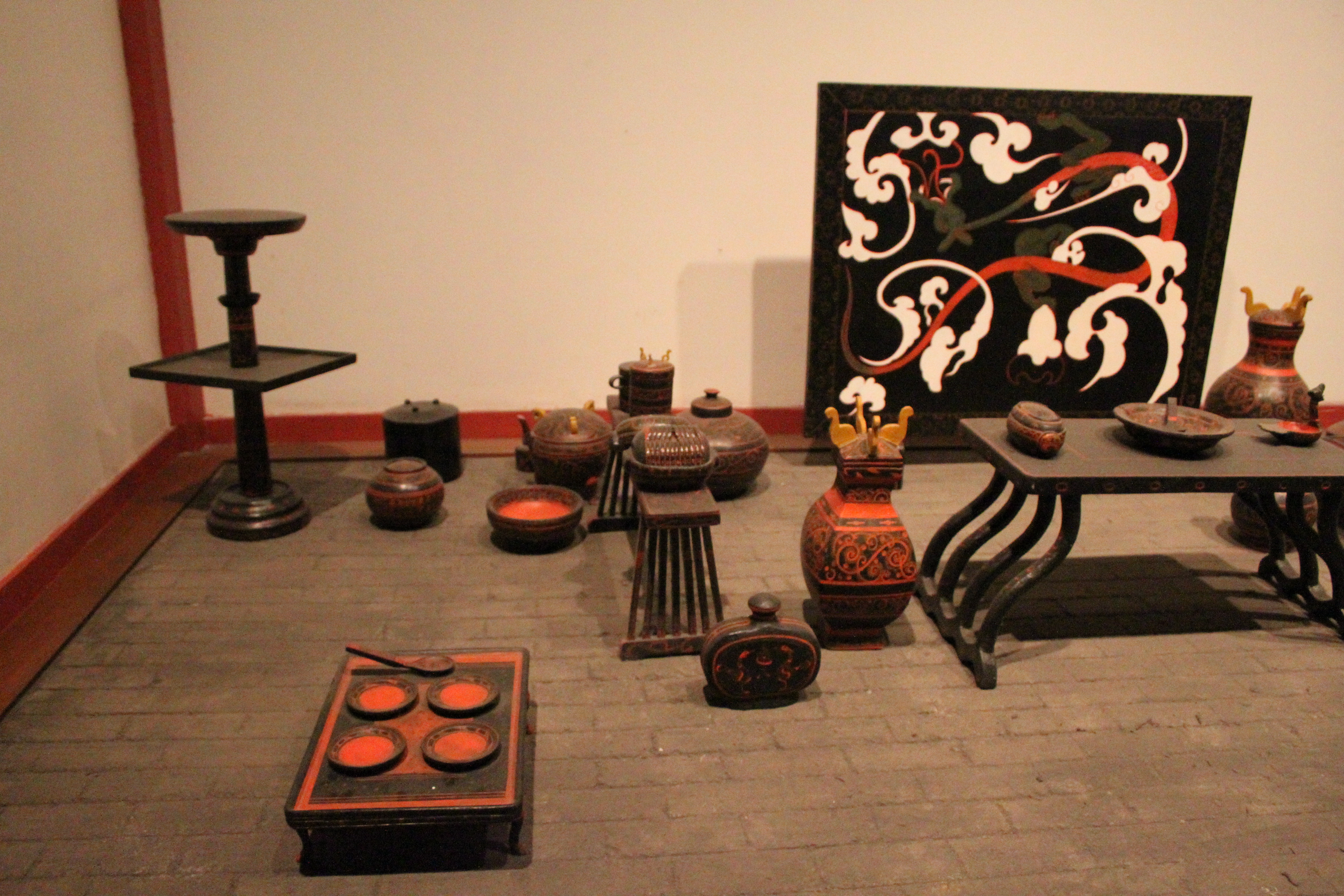
Museum display of lacquered furniture and furbishing. Lacquerware became a common luxury item from the Warring States to the Han dynasty.

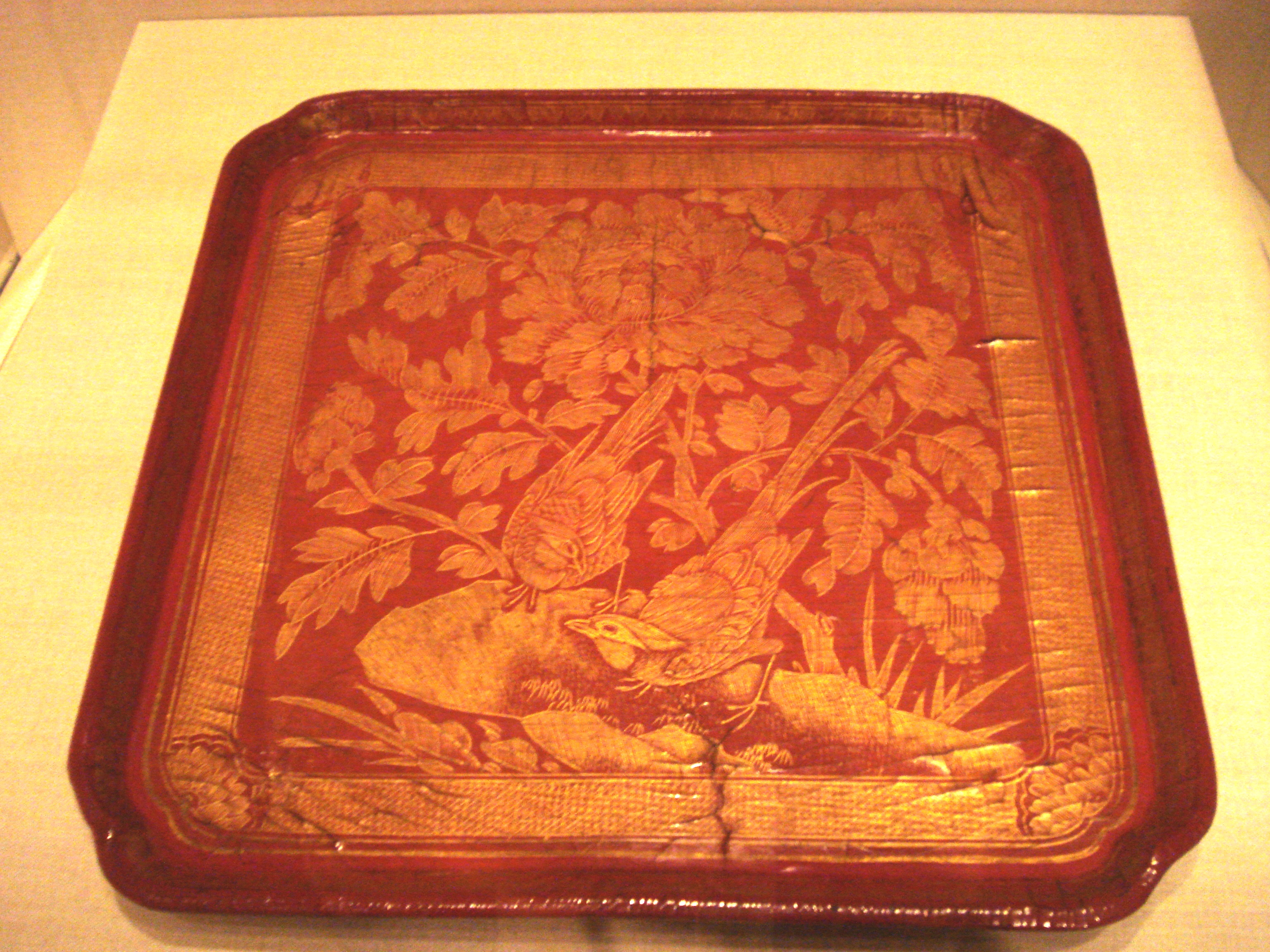
Song dynasty lacquer tray with the gold-engraving technique qiangjin applied to it, 12th or 13th century

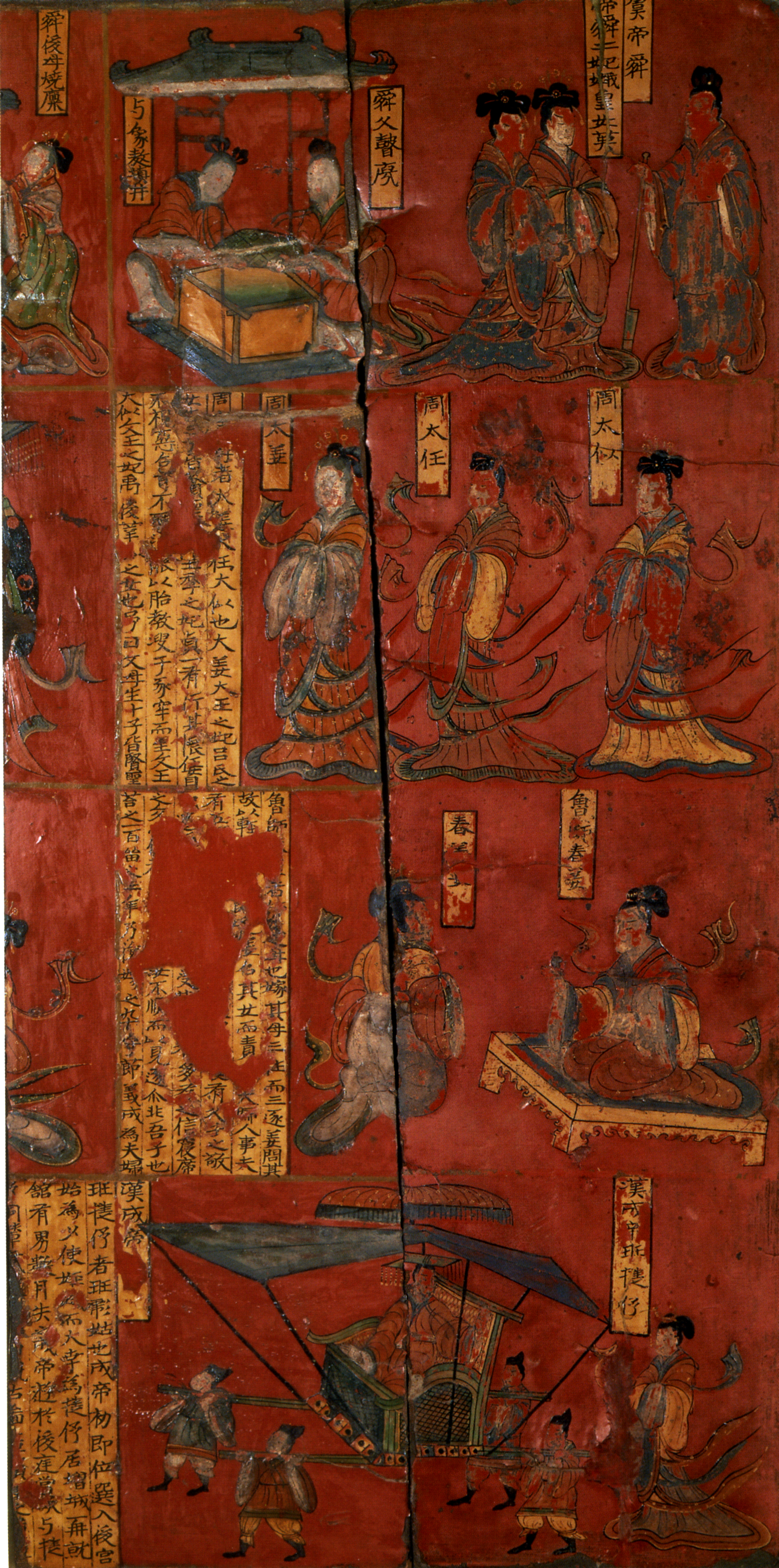
Lacquer painting from the Northern Wei dynasty.

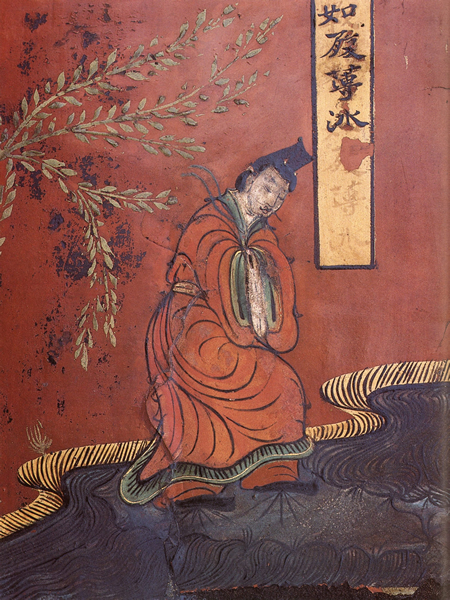
Male figure wearing Hanfu robes, from lacquerware painting over wood, Northern Wei period, 5th century AD

During the Shang dynasty (ca. 1600–1046 BC), Chinese lacquer craftsmanship developed into a sophisticated decorative art.

During the Eastern Zhou period (771–256 BC), lacquerware began appearing in large quantity. This is the earliest era from which notable quantities of lacquerware have survived, with the kingdom of Chu producing the largest number of lacquerware. The state of Chu having the geographical advantage and warmer climates enabled dedicated mass cultivation of lacquer trees and for lacquerware to become a commercial industry. Because of this, Chu-state became famous for its lacquerware exports in the neighbouring states in the Zhou kingdom, with literary references found in books like Zhuangzi and Shangshu, and providing some cultural cross-pollination between the southern culture of Chu and the culture of Zhongyuan.

At the time of the Han dynasty (206 BC – 220 AD), special administrations were established to organize and divide labor for the expanding lacquer production in China. Elaborate incised decorations were used in lacquerware during the Han dynasty.

In the Tang dynasty (618–907), Chinese lacquerware saw a new style marked by the use of sheets of gold or silver made in various shapes, such as birds, animals, and flowers. The cut-outs were affixed onto the surface of the lacquerware, after which new layers of lacquer were applied, dried, and then ground away, so the surface could be polished to reveal the golden or silvery patterns beneath. This was done by a technique known as pingtuo. Such techniques were time-consuming and costly, but these lacquerware were considered highly refined. It was also the period when the earliest practice of carving lacquerware began.

The art of inlaid gold, silver, and mother-of-pearl continued from the Tang into the Song dynasty (960–1279). Several existing decorative techniques gradually developed further after the 10th century, such as diaoqi (carved lacquer) which involves building up layers comprising thinly-applied coats of lacquer and carving it into a three-dimensional design; qiangjin (engraved gold) in which fine lines are incised, an adhesive of lacquer is applied, and gold foil or powder is pressed into the grooves; and diaotian or tianqi (filled-in) in which the lacquer is inlaid with lacquer of another color. A variation of diaotian or tianqi is known as moxian (polish-reveal) in which a design is built up with lacquer in certain areas, the remaining areas are filled with lacquer of a different color, and the entire surface is polished down. Especially the art of inlaying lacquer with mother-of-pearl was intensively developed during the Song dynasty. However, during the Song, the artistic craft also made use of inlaid gold in a process of which is to engrave intricate patterns in the lacquer surface and to fill the intaglio with gold powder.

Knowledge of Chinese lacquer techniques spread during the Han, Tang and Song dynasties, eventually reaching Korea and Japan. In Japan, the art of lacquer arrived alongside Buddhism and other cultural artifacts from China via the Korean Peninsula by the 8th century. One of the earliest Japanese techniques for decorating the lacquer surface was, besides painting simple designs, the gold and silver foil inlay of the Nara period (710–784), transmitted from China during the Tang dynasty. Carved lacquerware was introduced from Ming dynasty China during the 14th century.

Dry lacquer (Chinese: 干漆夹苎; Japanese: kanshitsu 乾漆) is a technique of building up sculptures from layers of lacquer-soaked cloth, used especially for Buddhist statues. It originated in China centuries before reaching Japan, where it gained widespread prominence by the mid-eighth century.

Coromandel lacquer is a Chinese export type, so called because it was shipped to European markets via the Coromandel coast of India.

==== Gallery ====
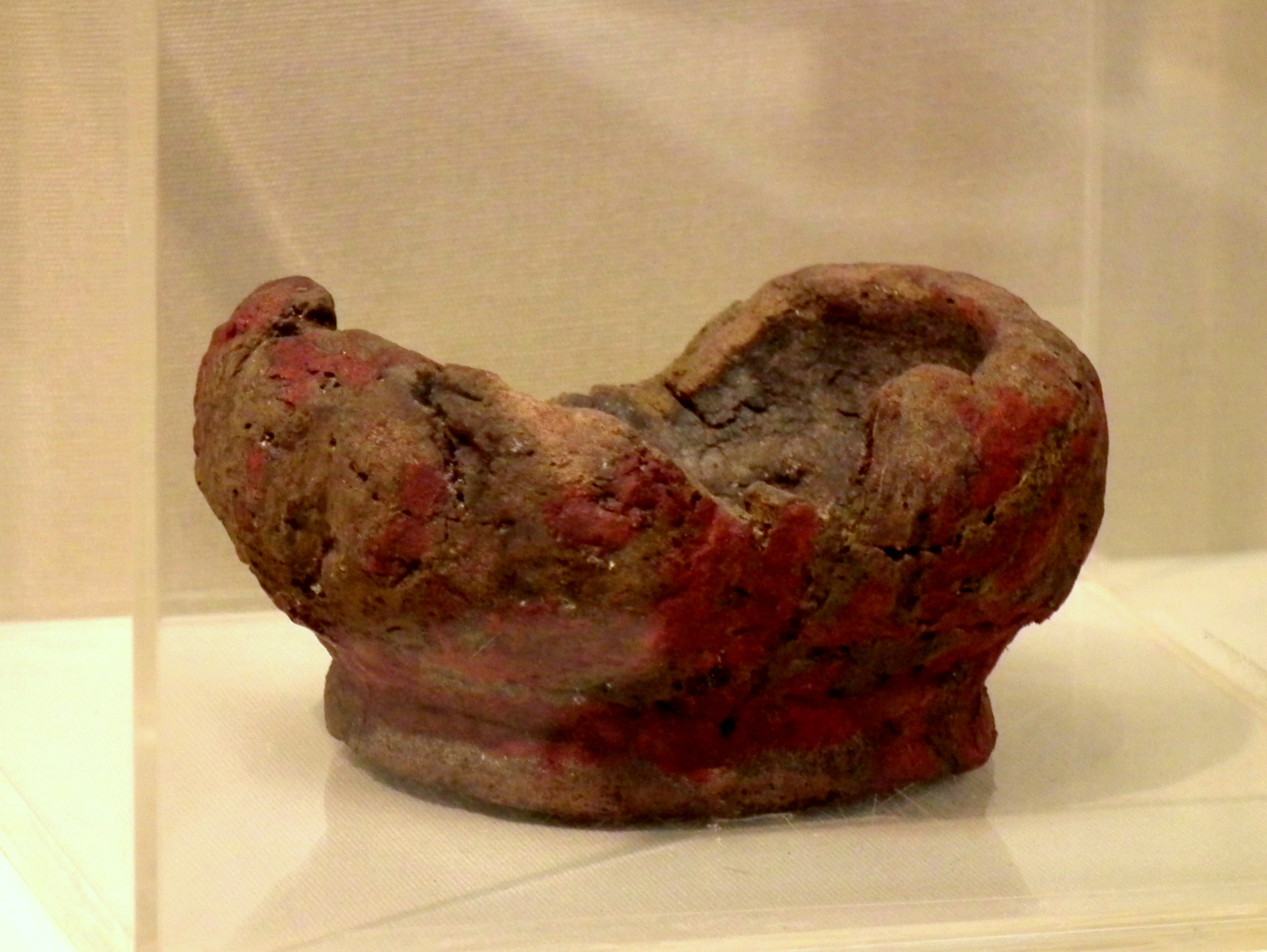
Red lacquer wood bowl from the Chinese Hemudu culture dated to 4000–5000 BC, the oldest such piece ever found.

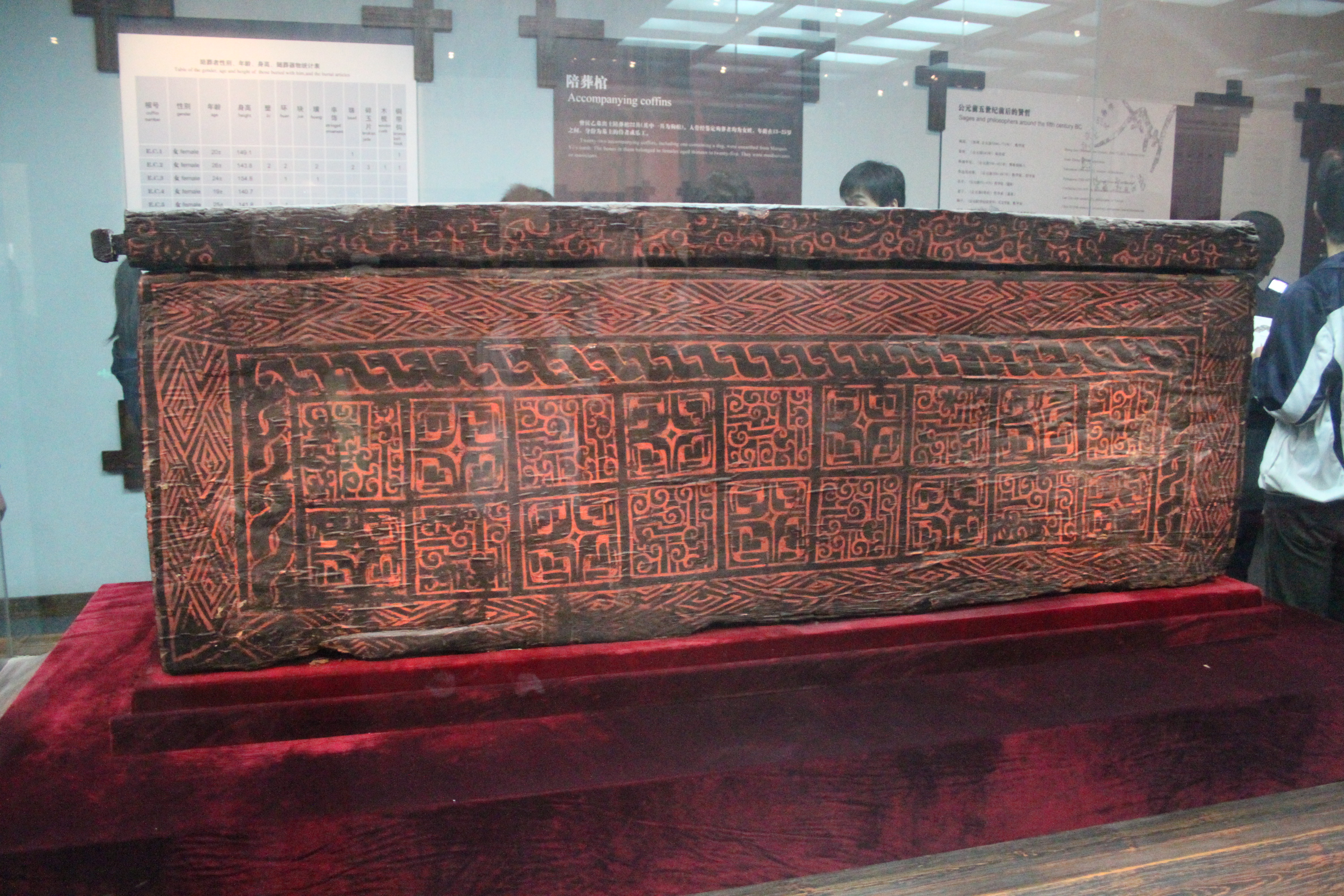
Coffin from the Tomb of Marquis Yi of Zeng

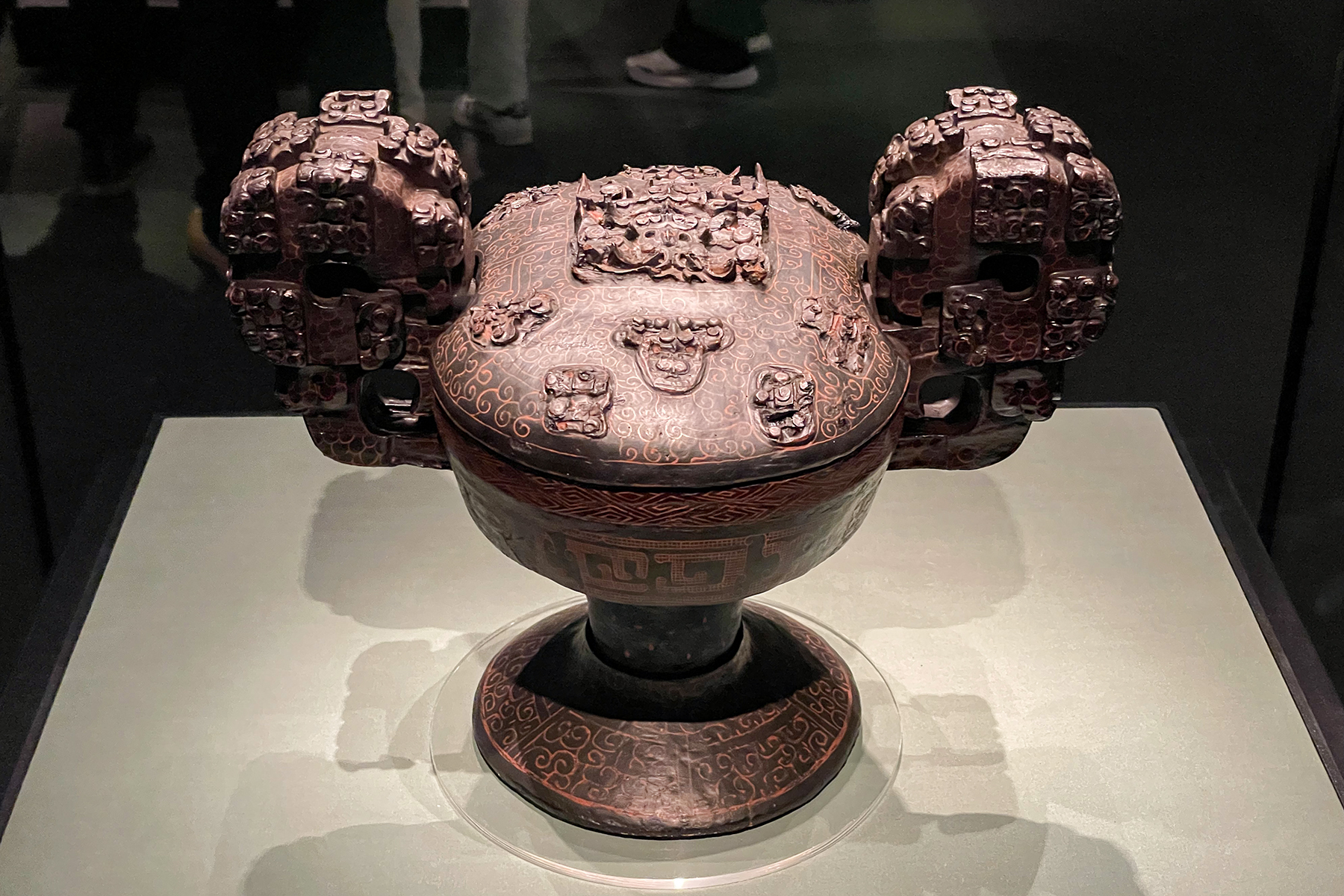
Lacquer dou-vessel from the Tomb of Marquis Yi of Zeng

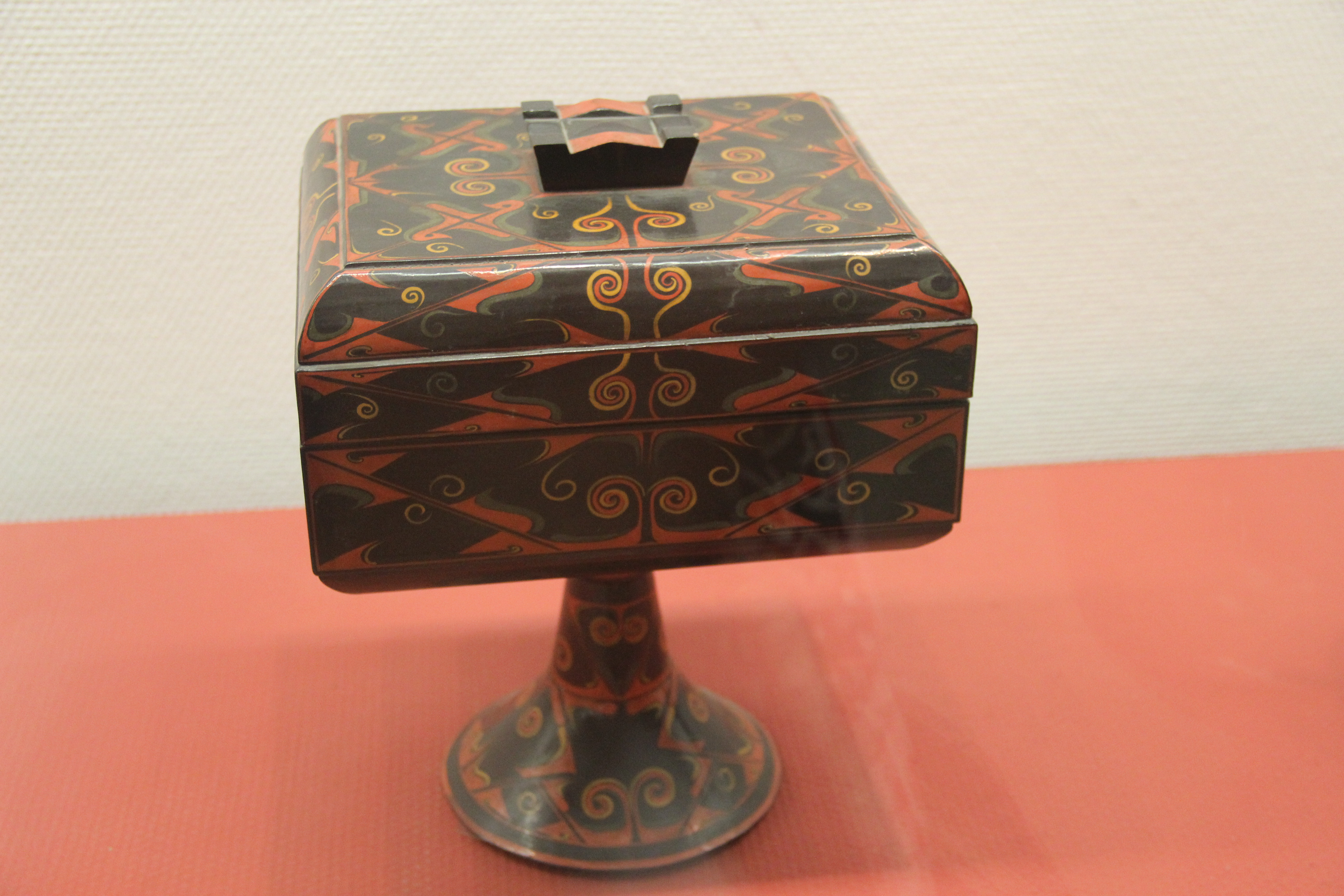
Lacquerware box, Warring States period, Henan Provincial Museum

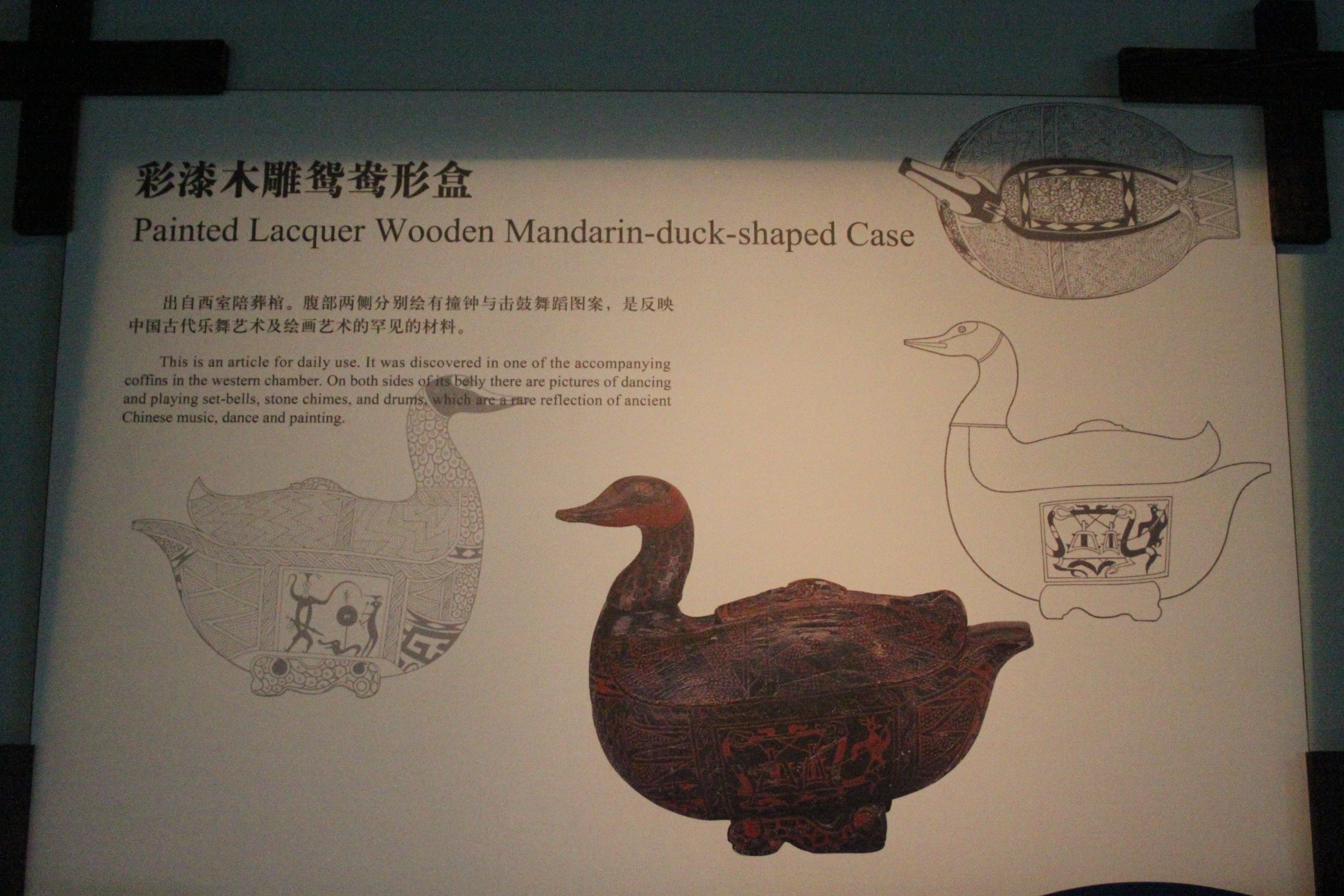
Painted Lacquered Wood Mandarin Duck-shaped Case, Tomb of Marquis Yi of Zeng

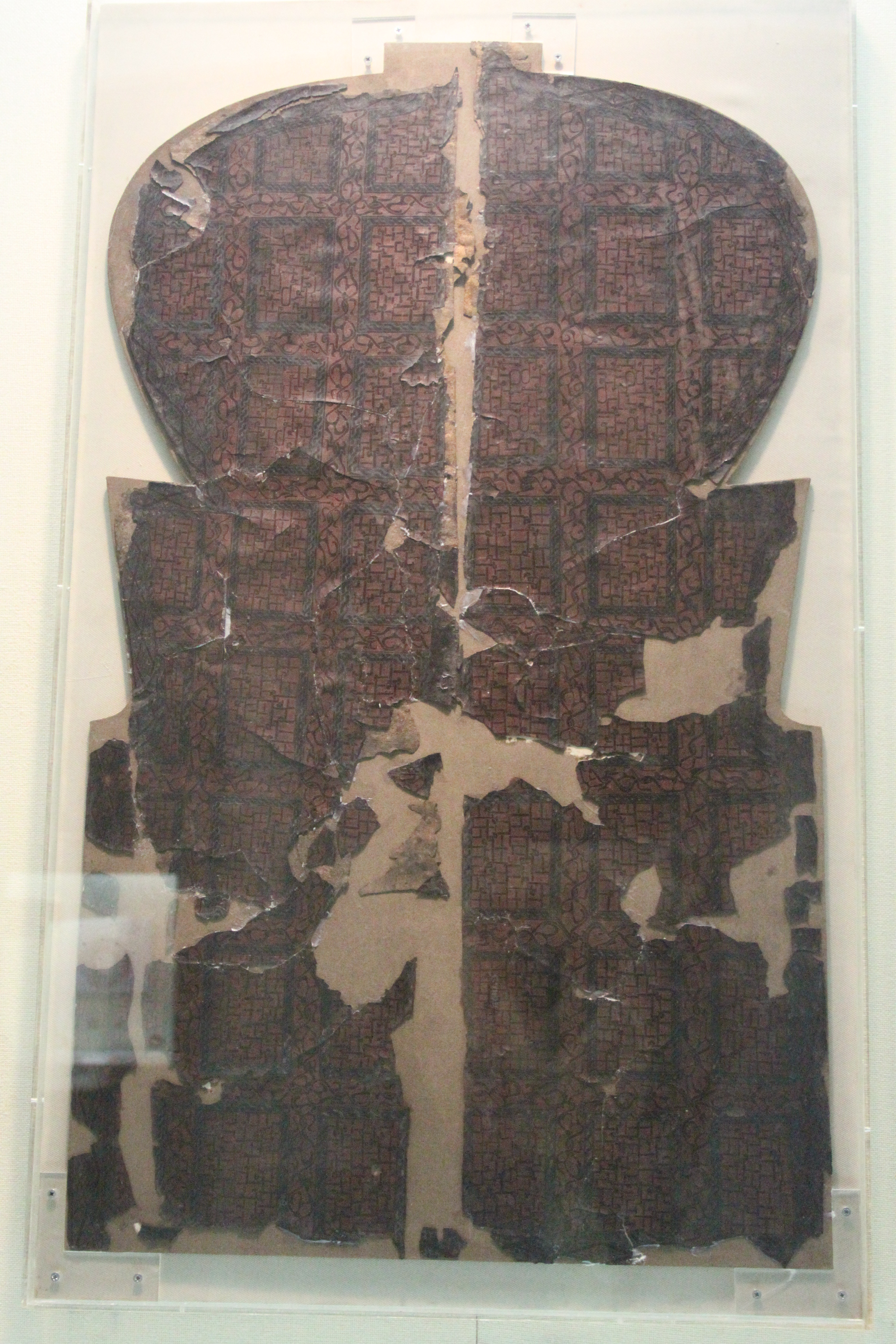
Lacquered Shield, Tomb of Marquis Yi of Zeng

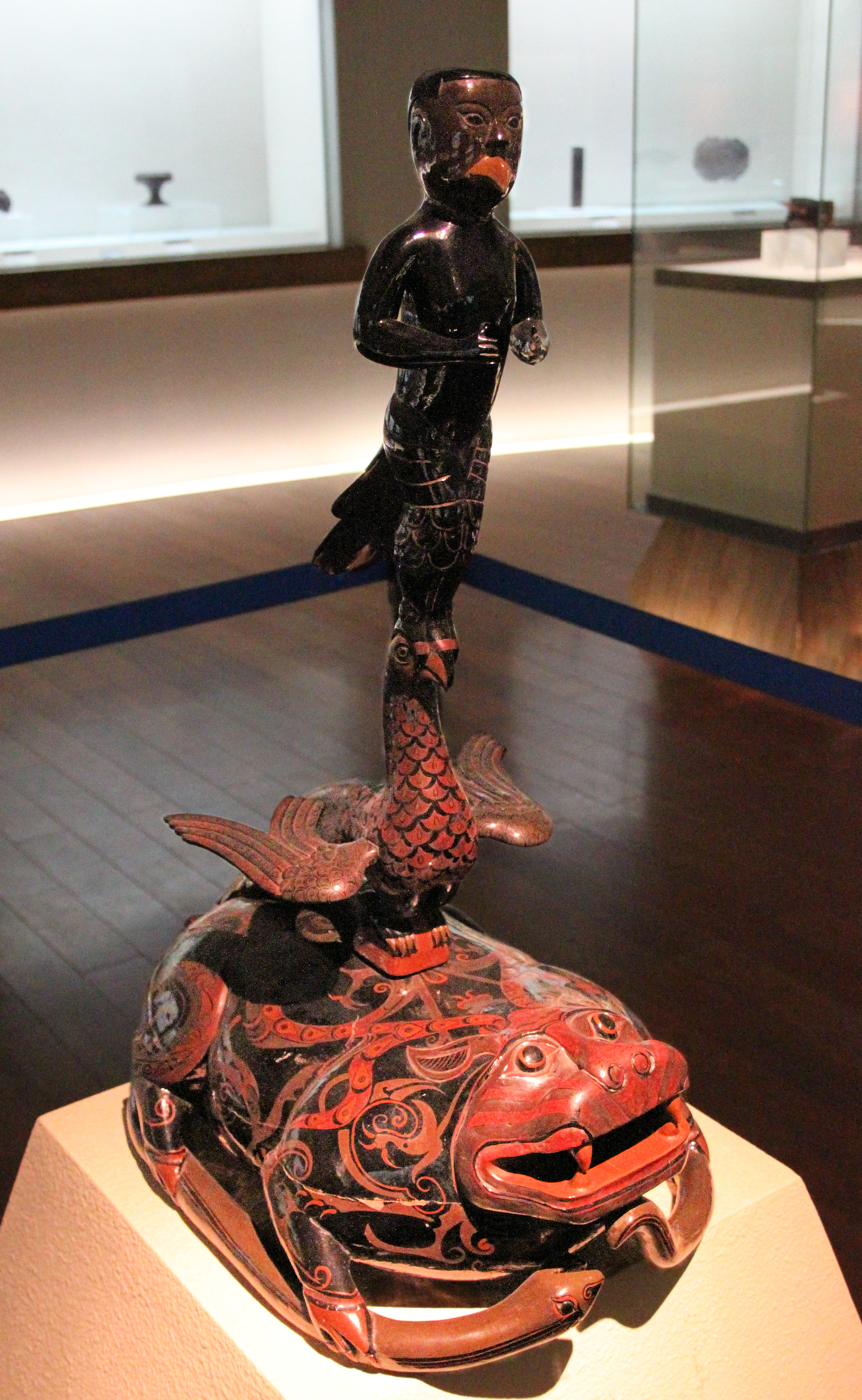
Lacquered birdman (羽人) figure on a toad stand, Chu kingdom, Warring States period

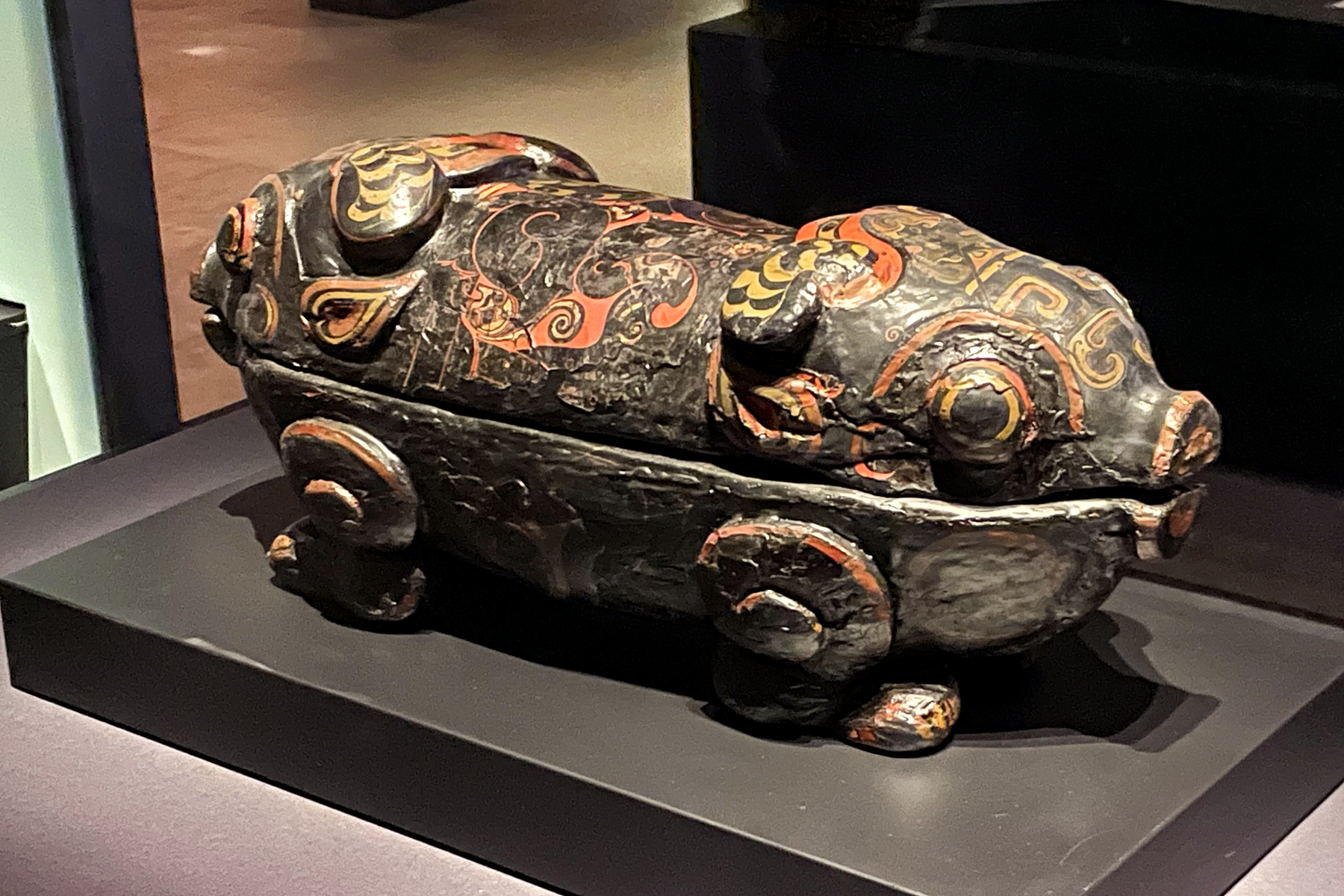
Lacquer box in shape of pigs, Chu kingdom, Warring States

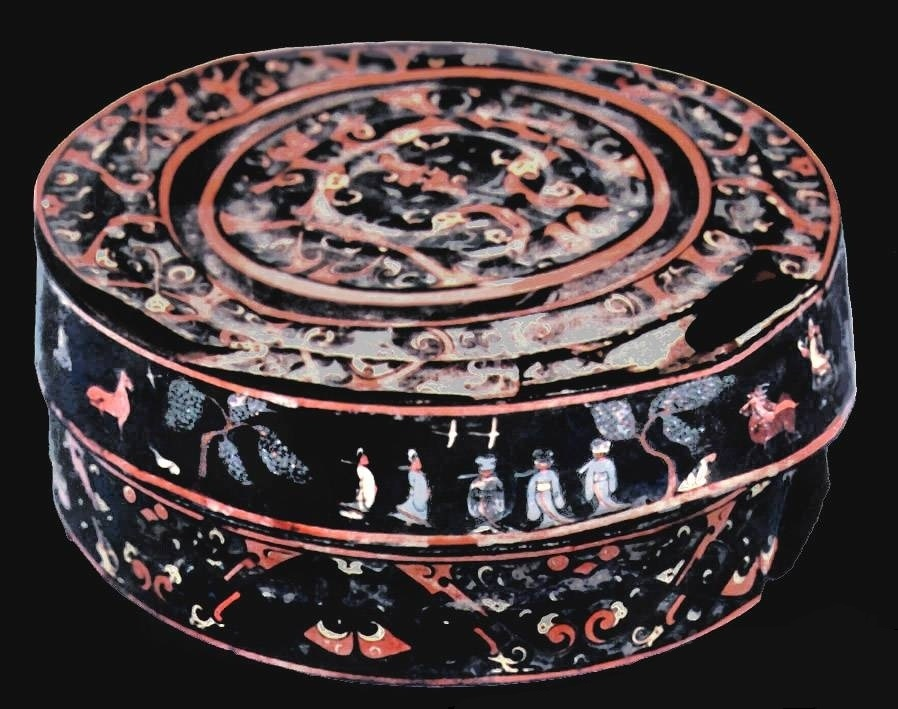
Lacquerware box from the Jingmen Tomb (荊門楚墓; Jīngmén chǔ mù) of the State of Chu (704–223 BC)

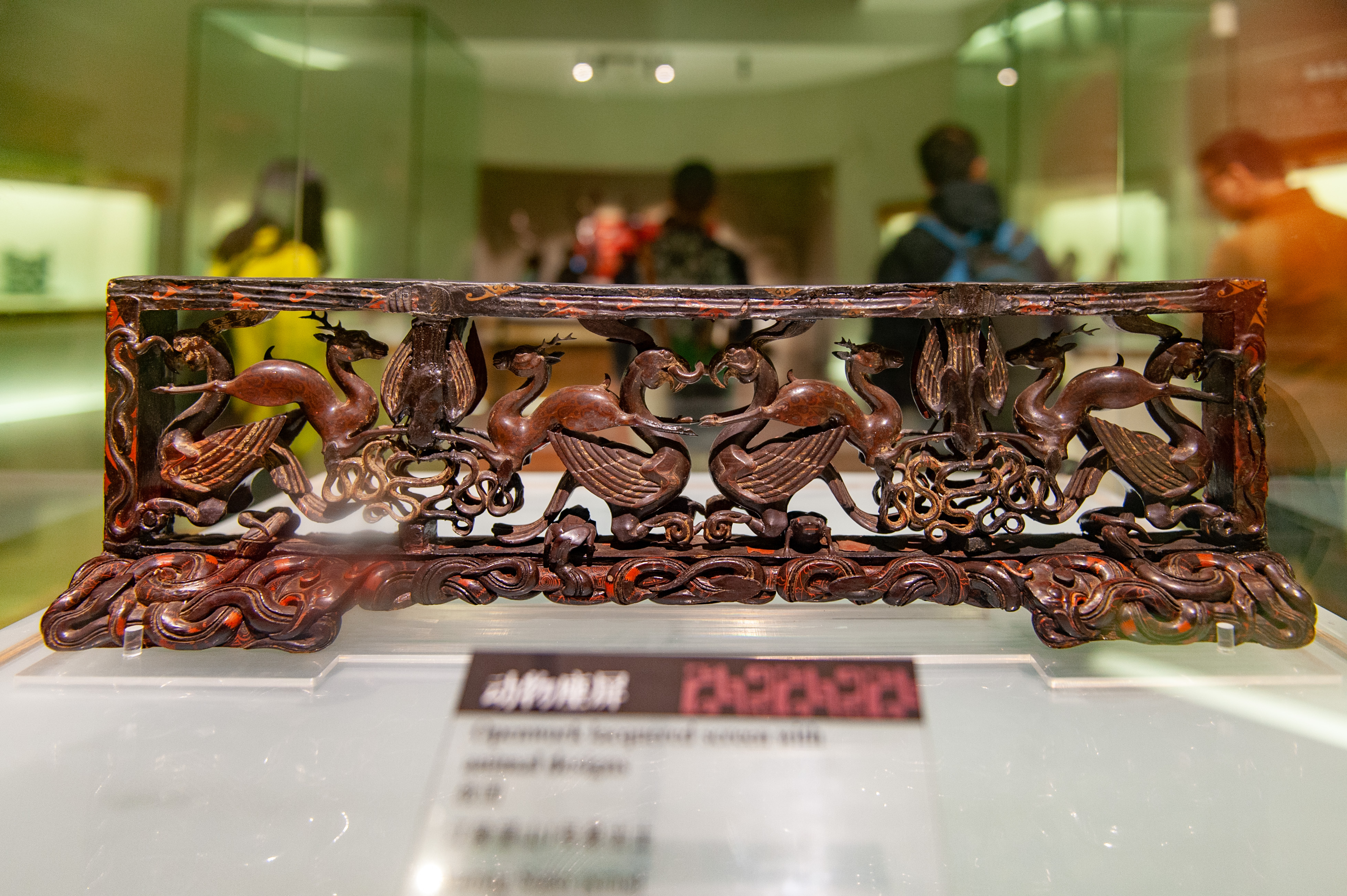
Openwork lacquered screen with animal designs, Wangshan Tomb, Chu kingdom, Warring States period

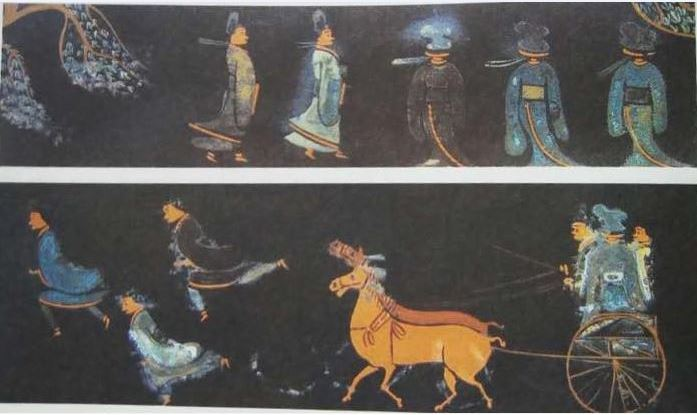
Details on the Chu lacquerware box of the Jingmen Tomb, depicting men wearing precursors to Hanfu (i.e. traditional silk dress) and riding in a two-horsed chariot

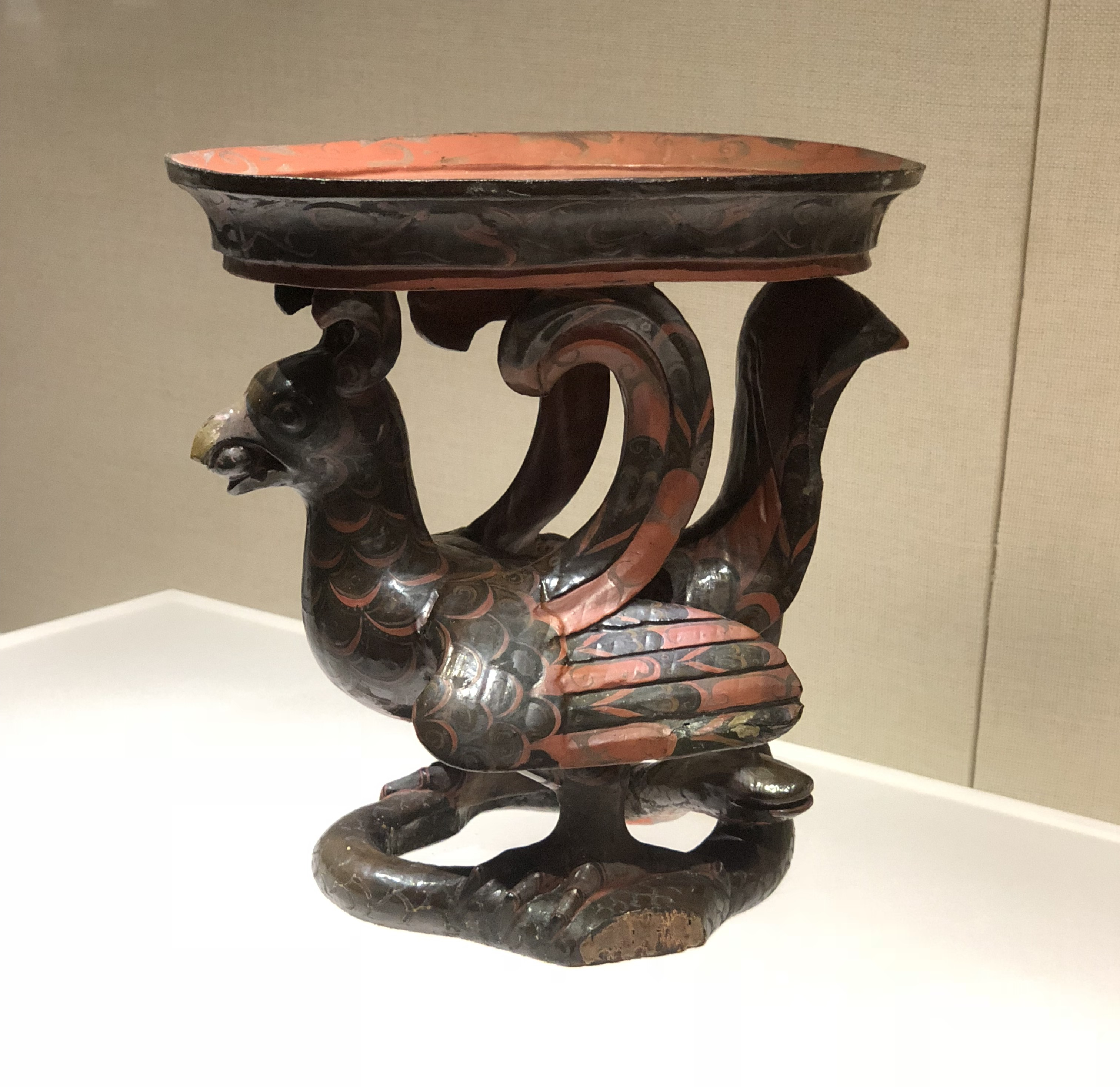
Zhuque dou-vessel, State of Chu Warring States,

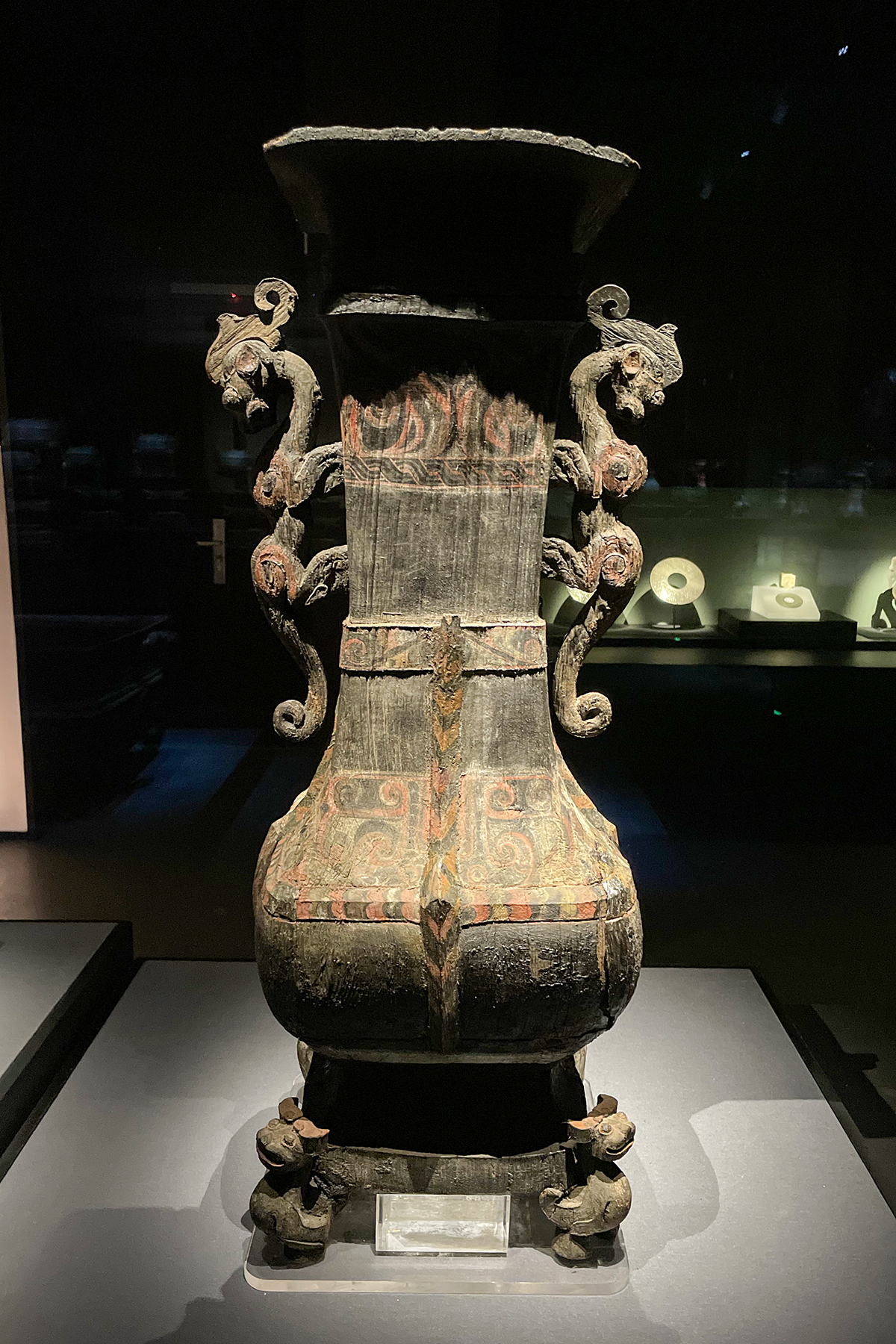
Painted lacquer hu-jar with dragon-shaped handles, Warring States period

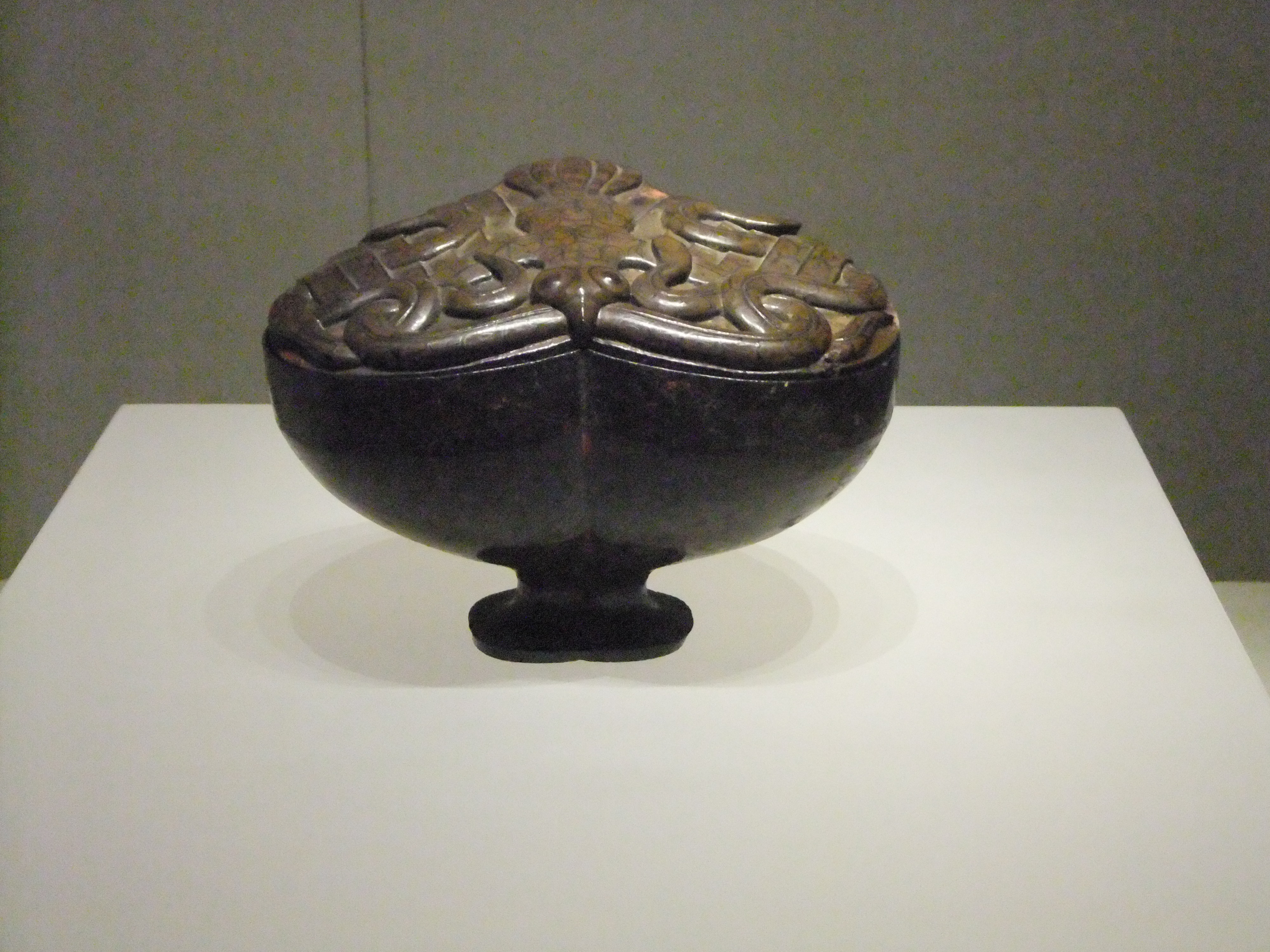
Lacquer box of phoenix pattern, Warring States era, Hubei Museum

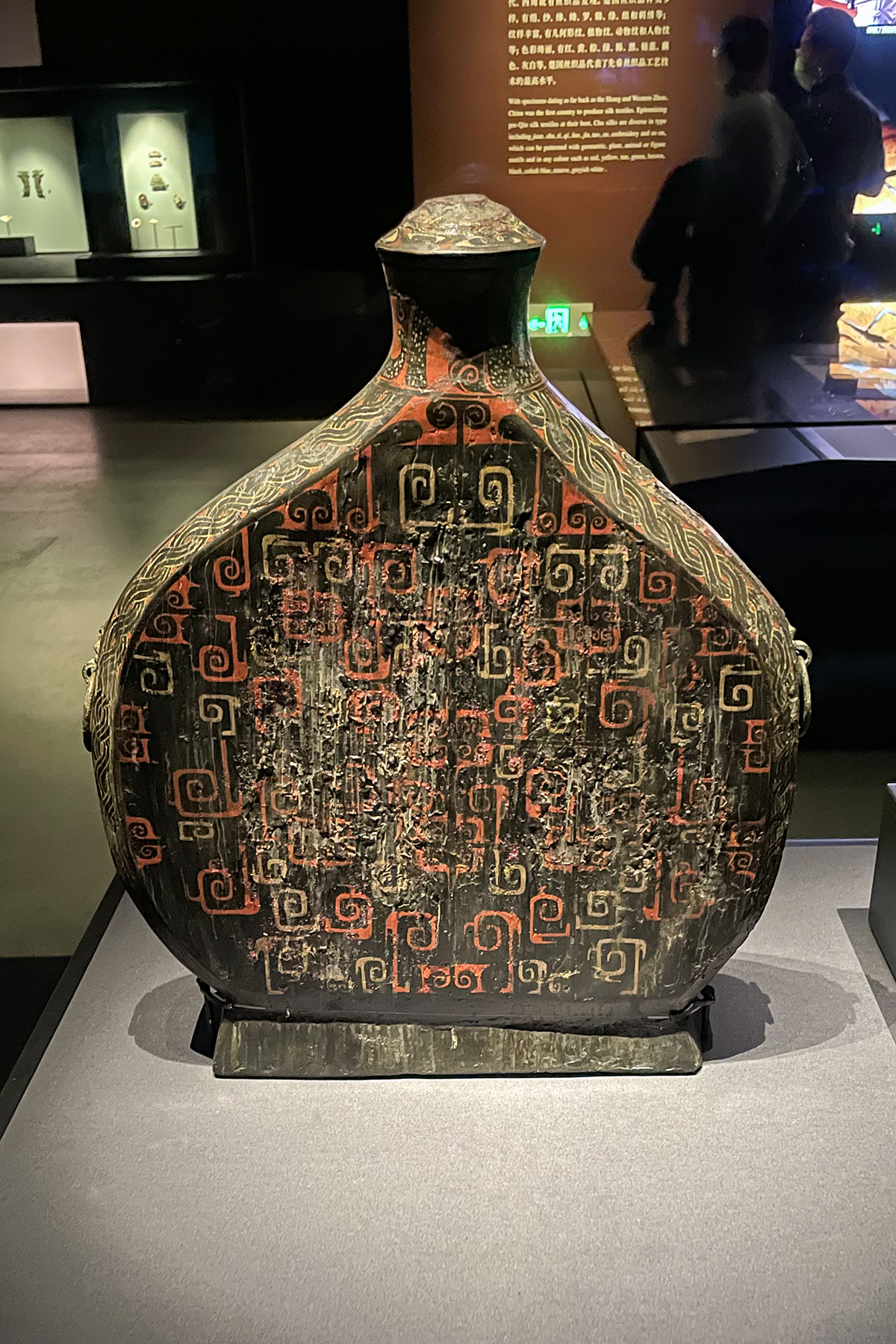
Painted lacquer flat flask with coiled serpents, Warring States era

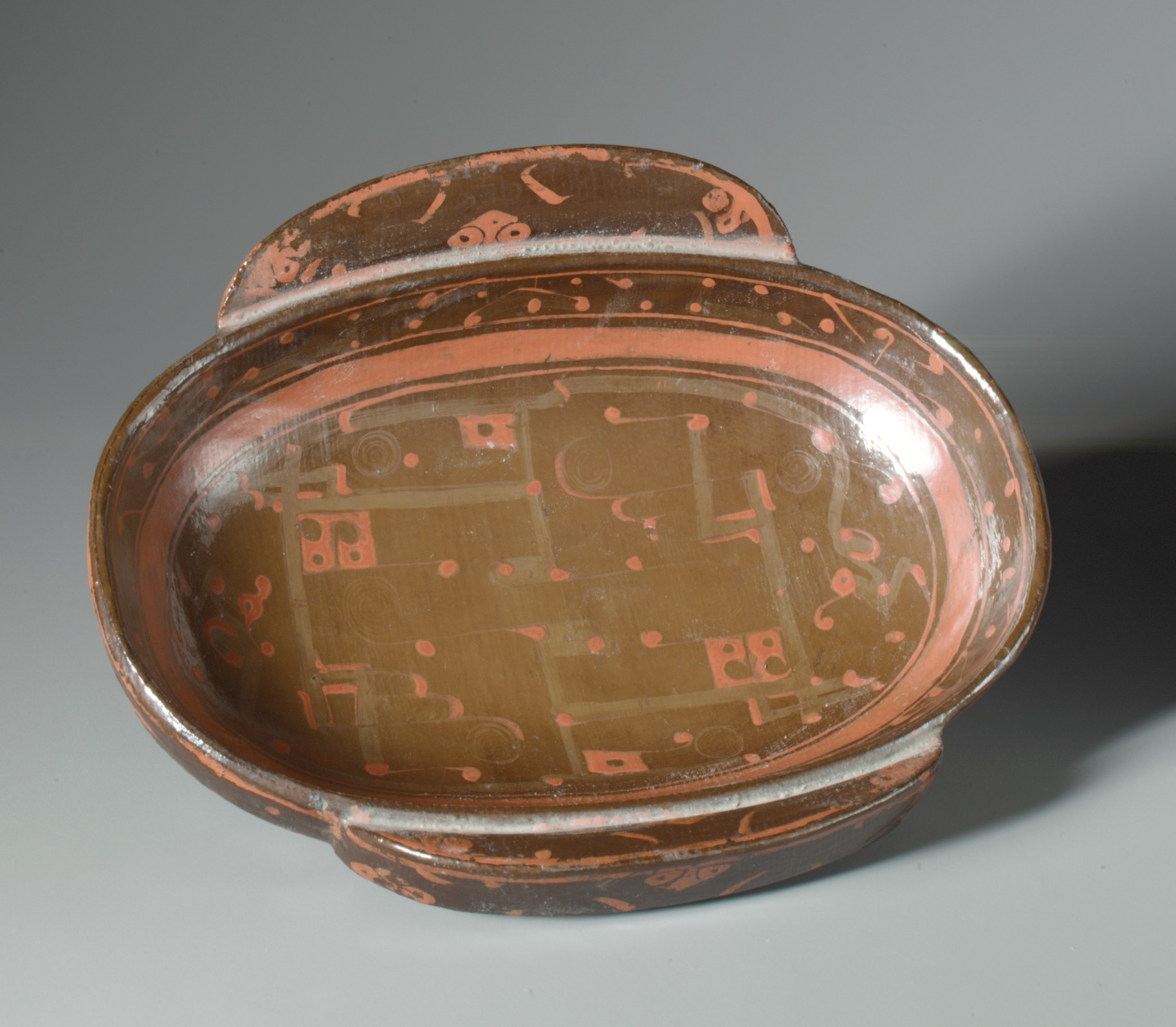
Lacquered winged goblet (zh:羽觞), also known as "eared" or flanged cup (耳杯) from Warring States era

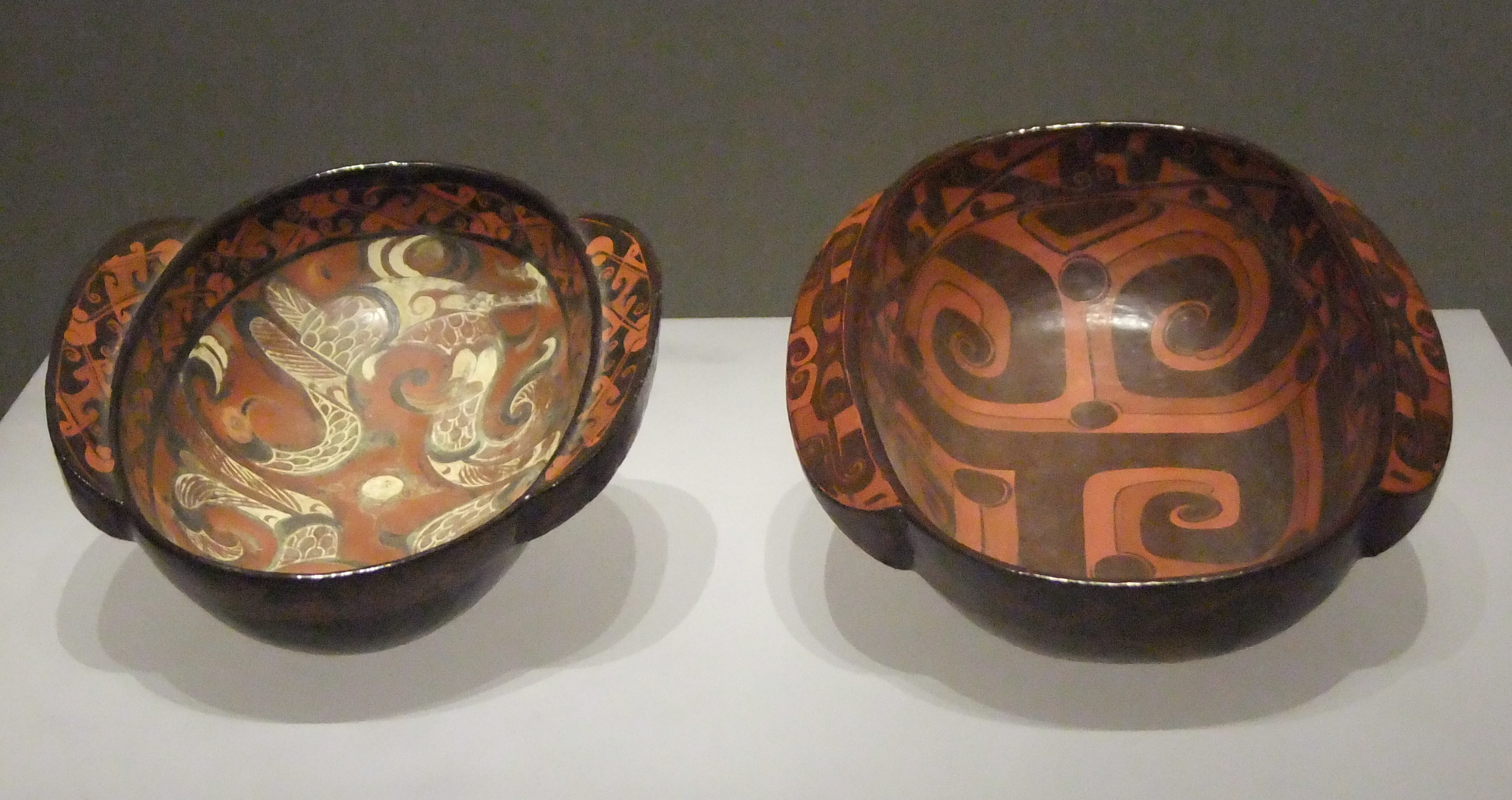
Lacquered flanged cup with cloud designs from Warring States, Jingzhou Museum, Hubei

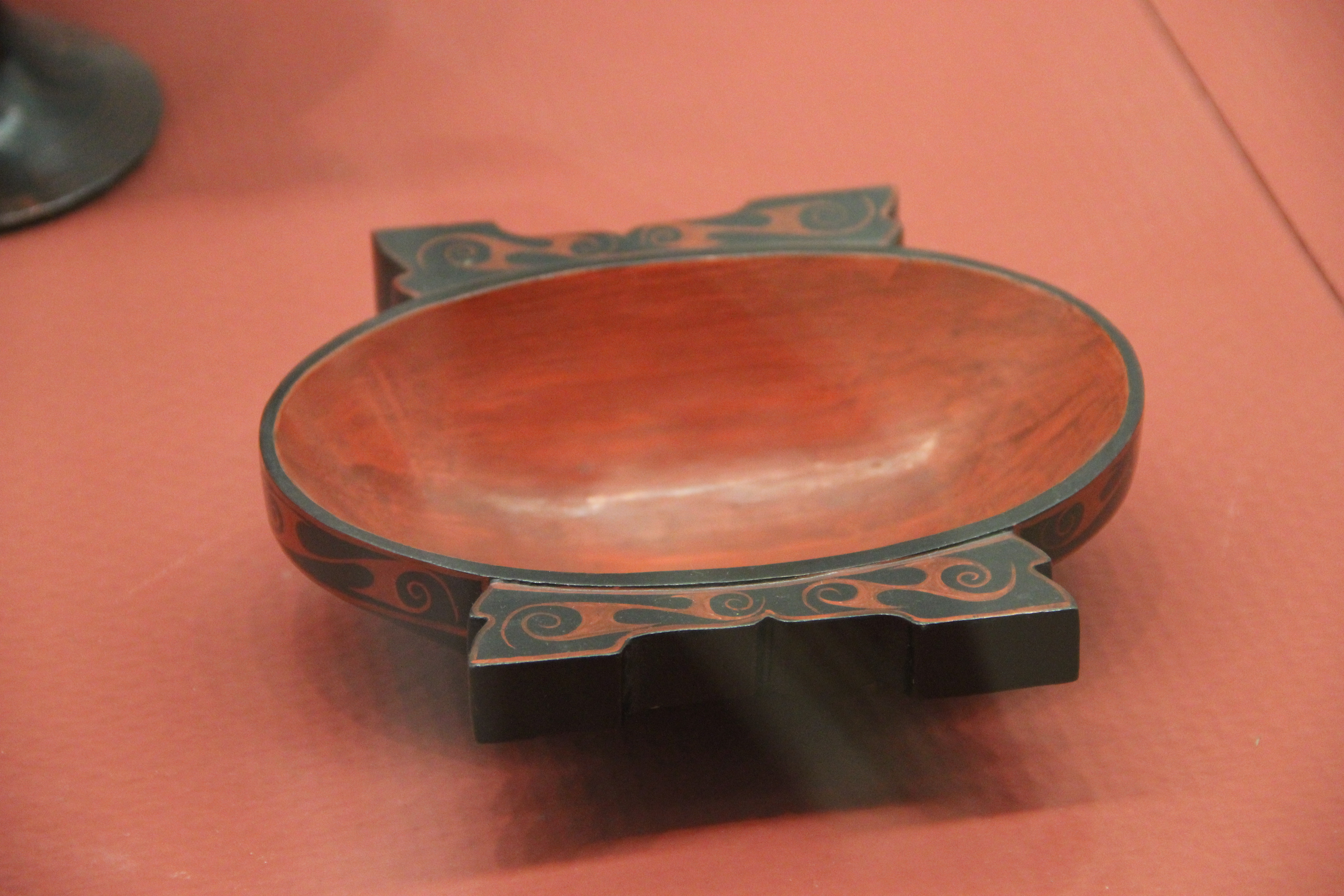
Lacquered winged cup from Warring States with geometric design, Henan Provincial Museum

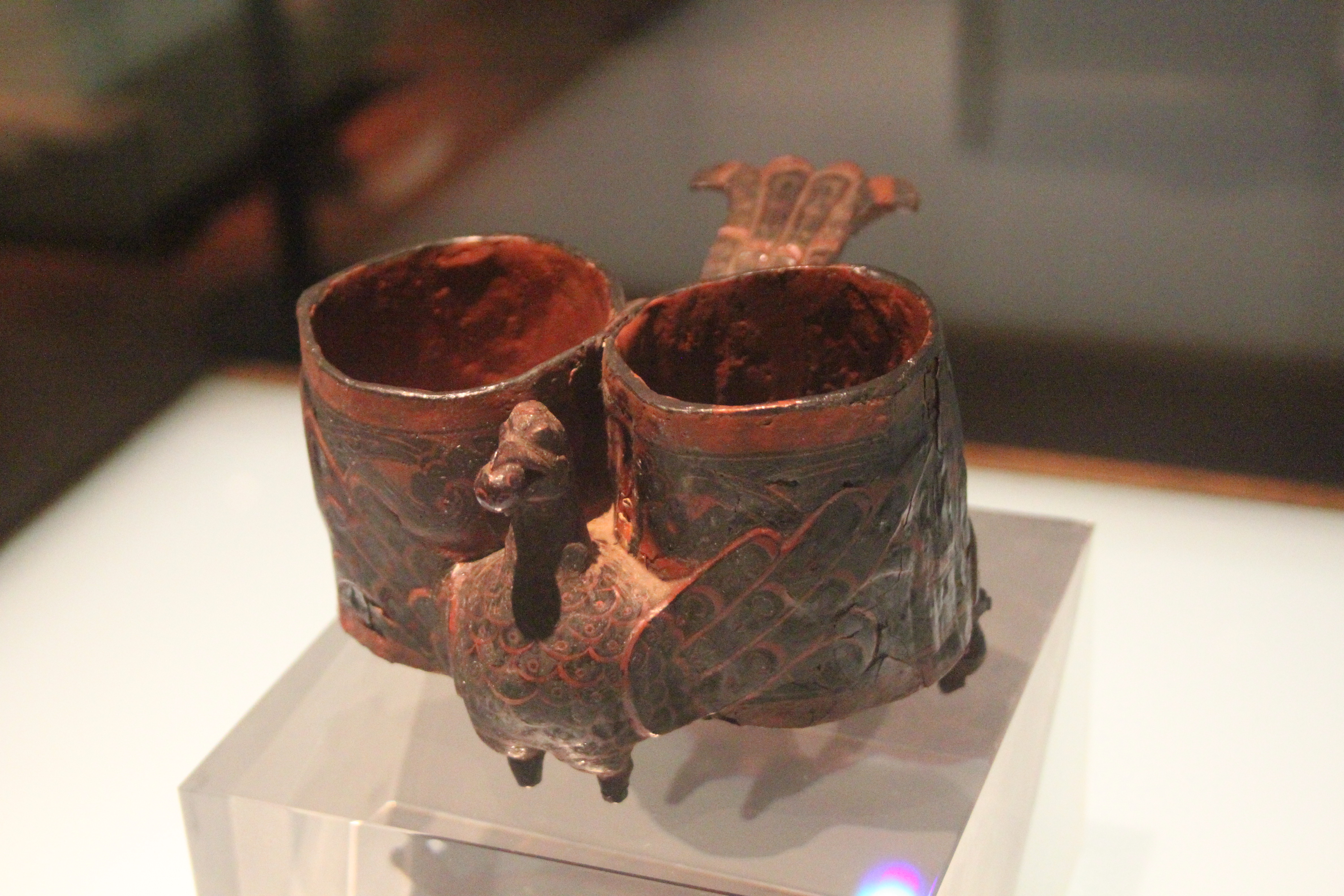
Lacquer phoenix cup, state of Chu, Warring States

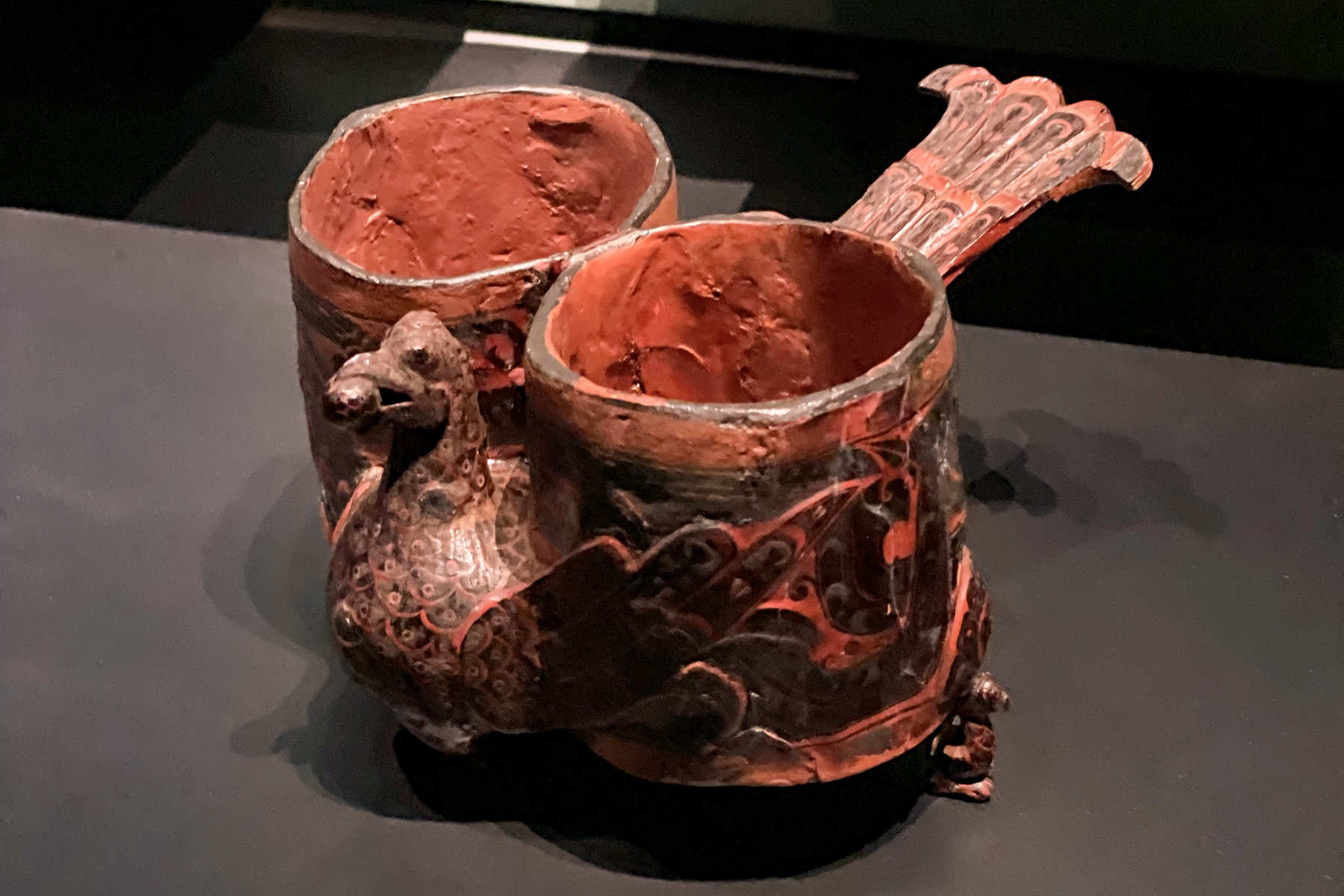
Lacquer phoenix cup, state of Chu, Warring States

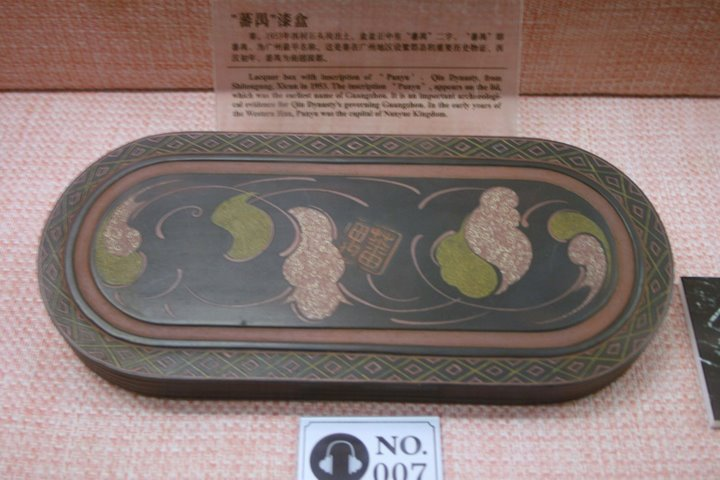
Lacquer box incised with "Panyu" in seal script, Qin dynasty era, Guangzhou City Museum

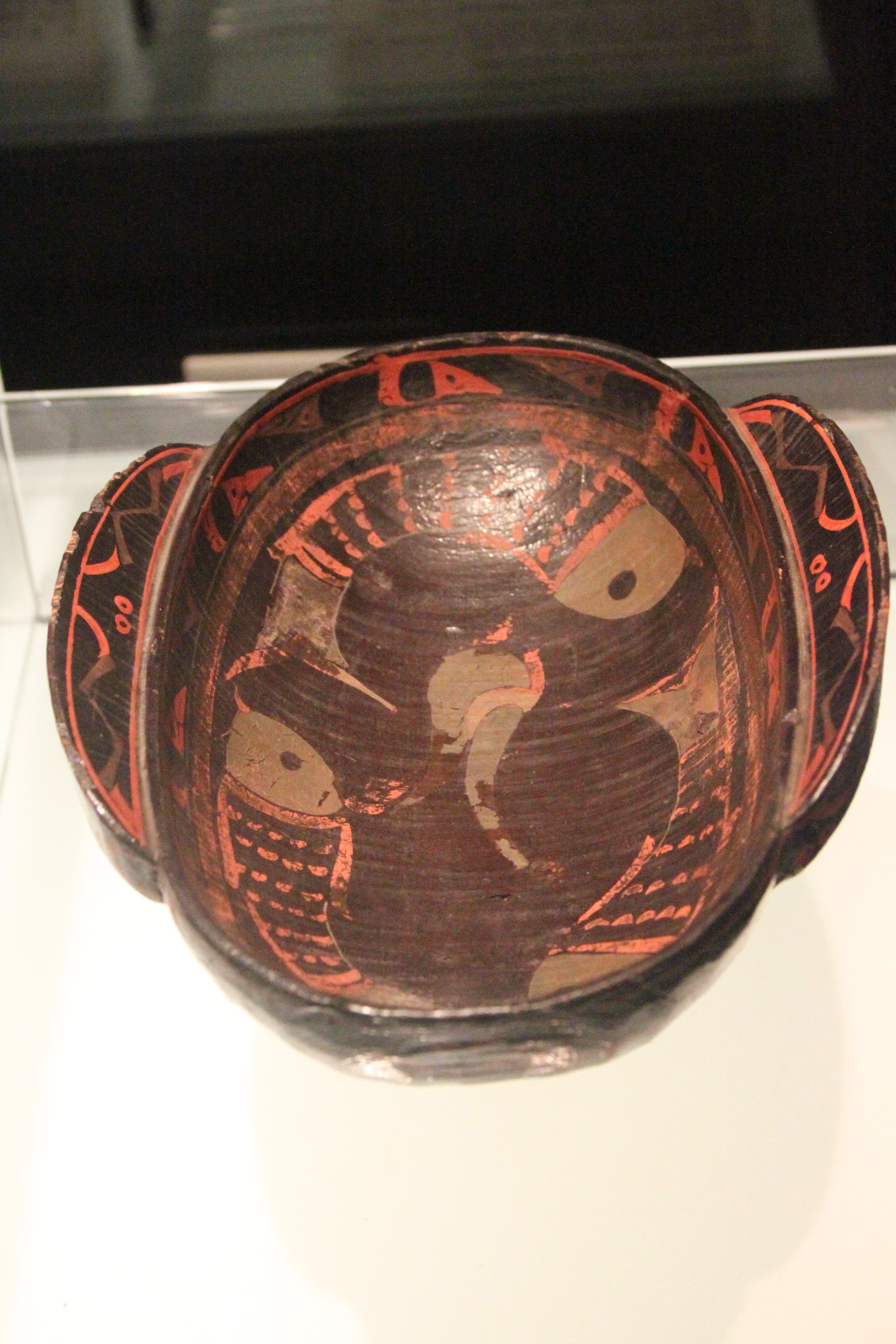
"Eared" or flanged cup (耳杯), Qin-Han dynasty, Hubei Provincial Museum

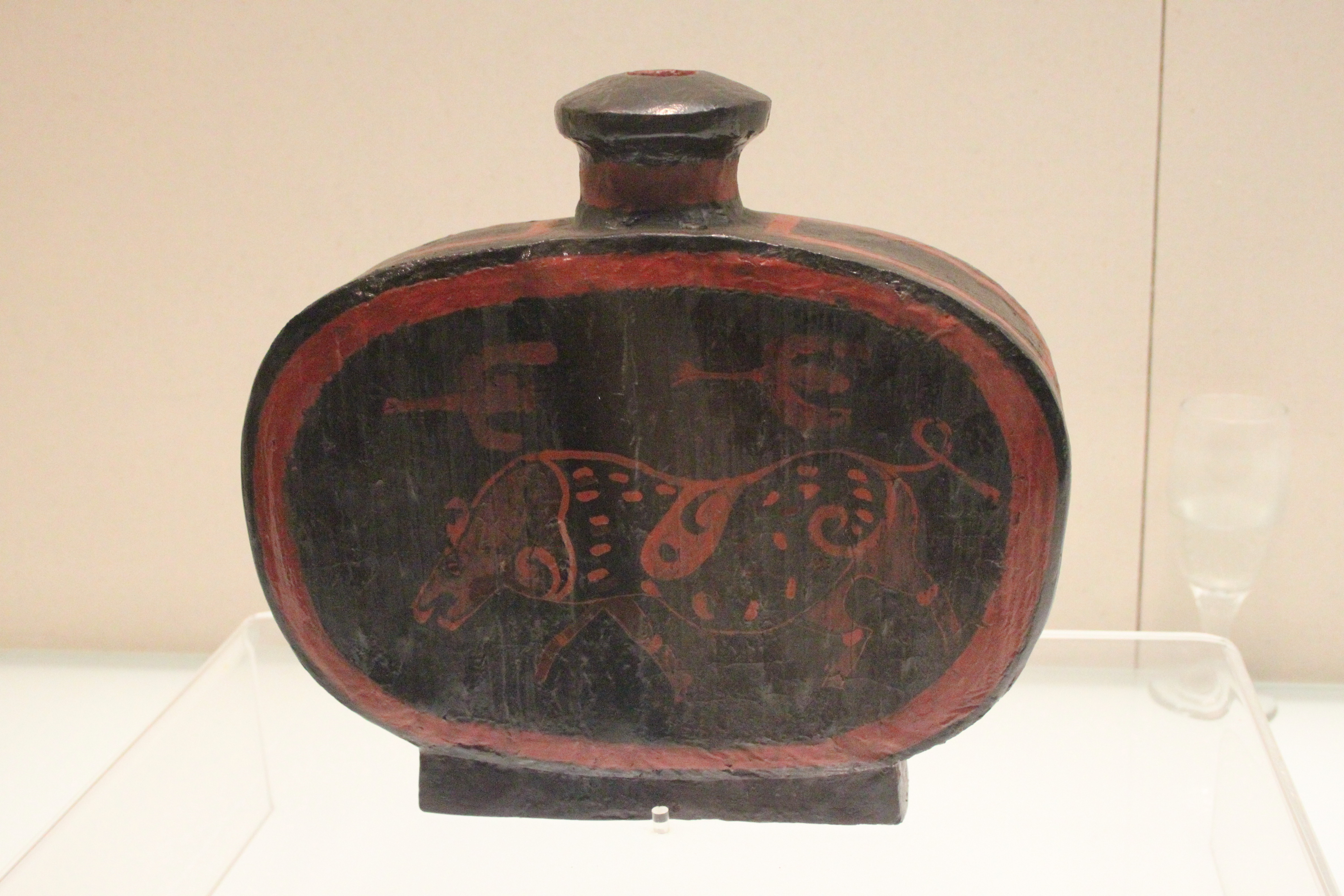
Lacquered flask, Qin-Han dynasty, Hubei Provincial Museum

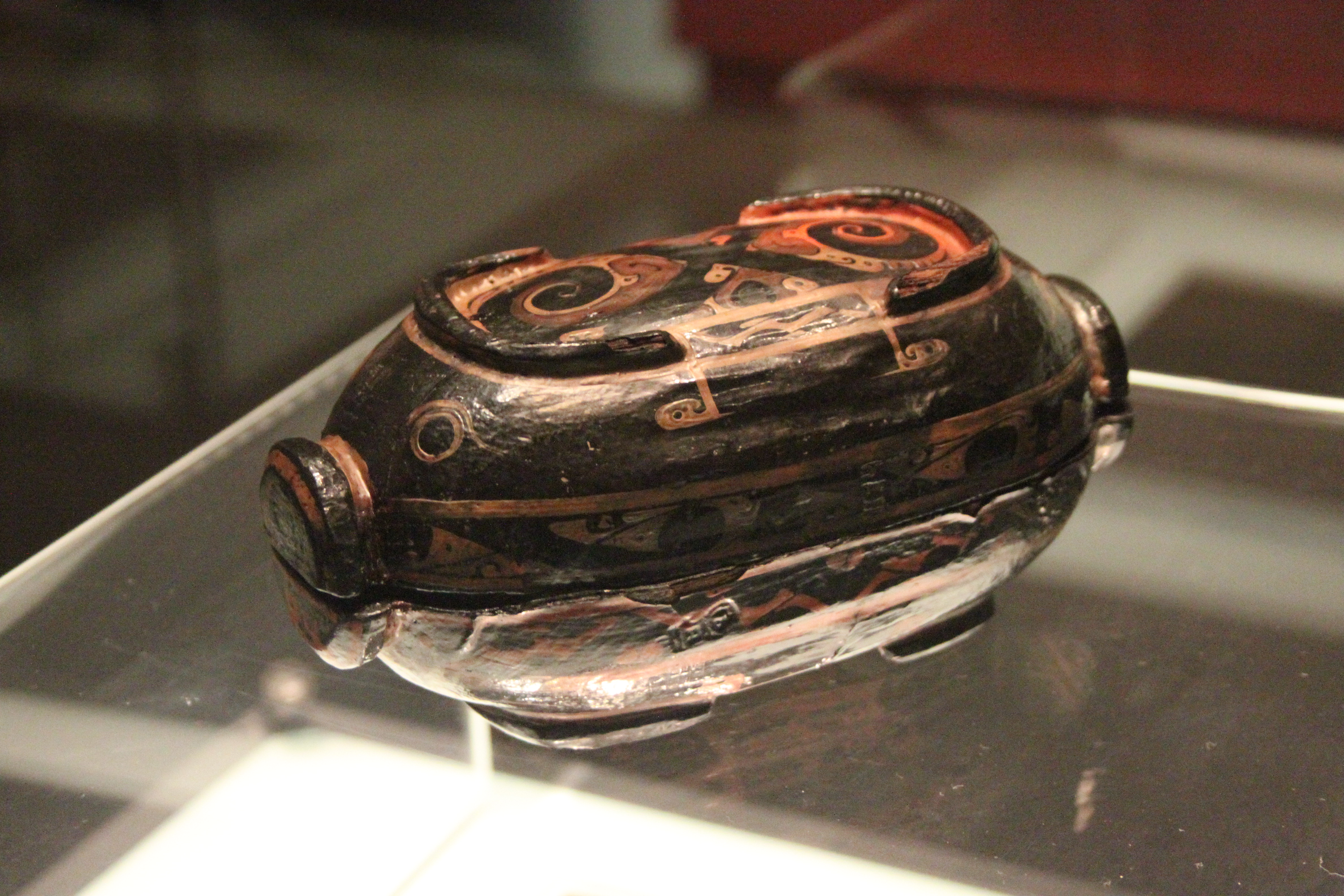
Pig-shaped lacquered case, Qin-Han dynasty, Hubei Provincial Museum

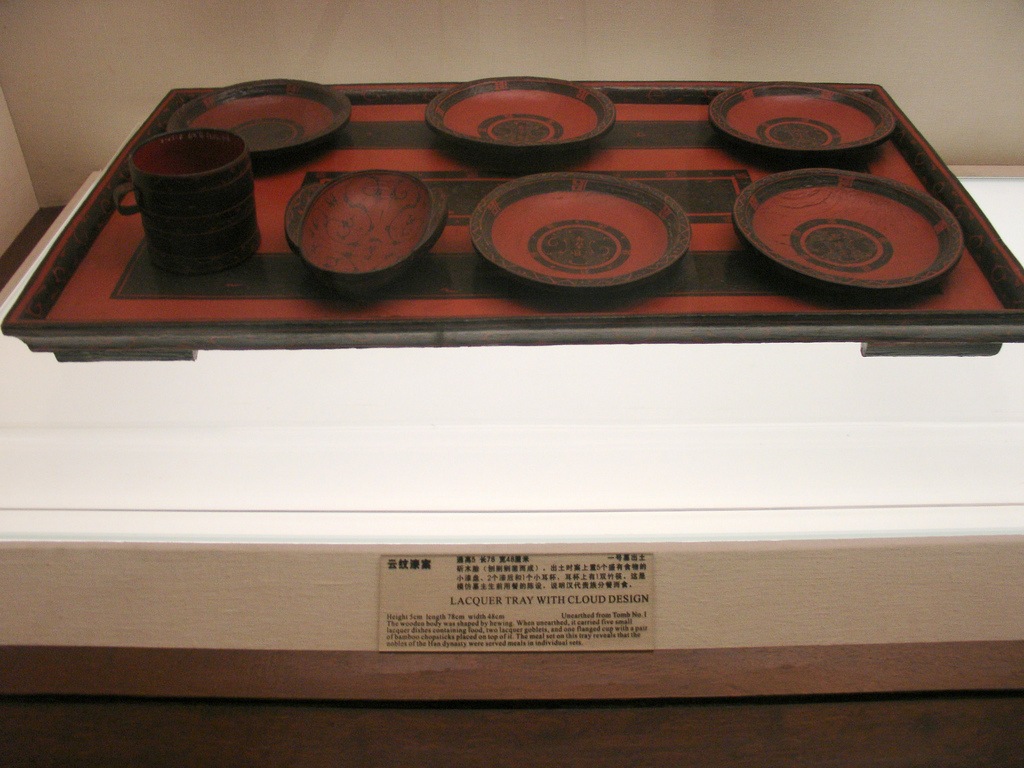
Han dynasty lacquerware unearthed at Mawangdui, 2nd century BC

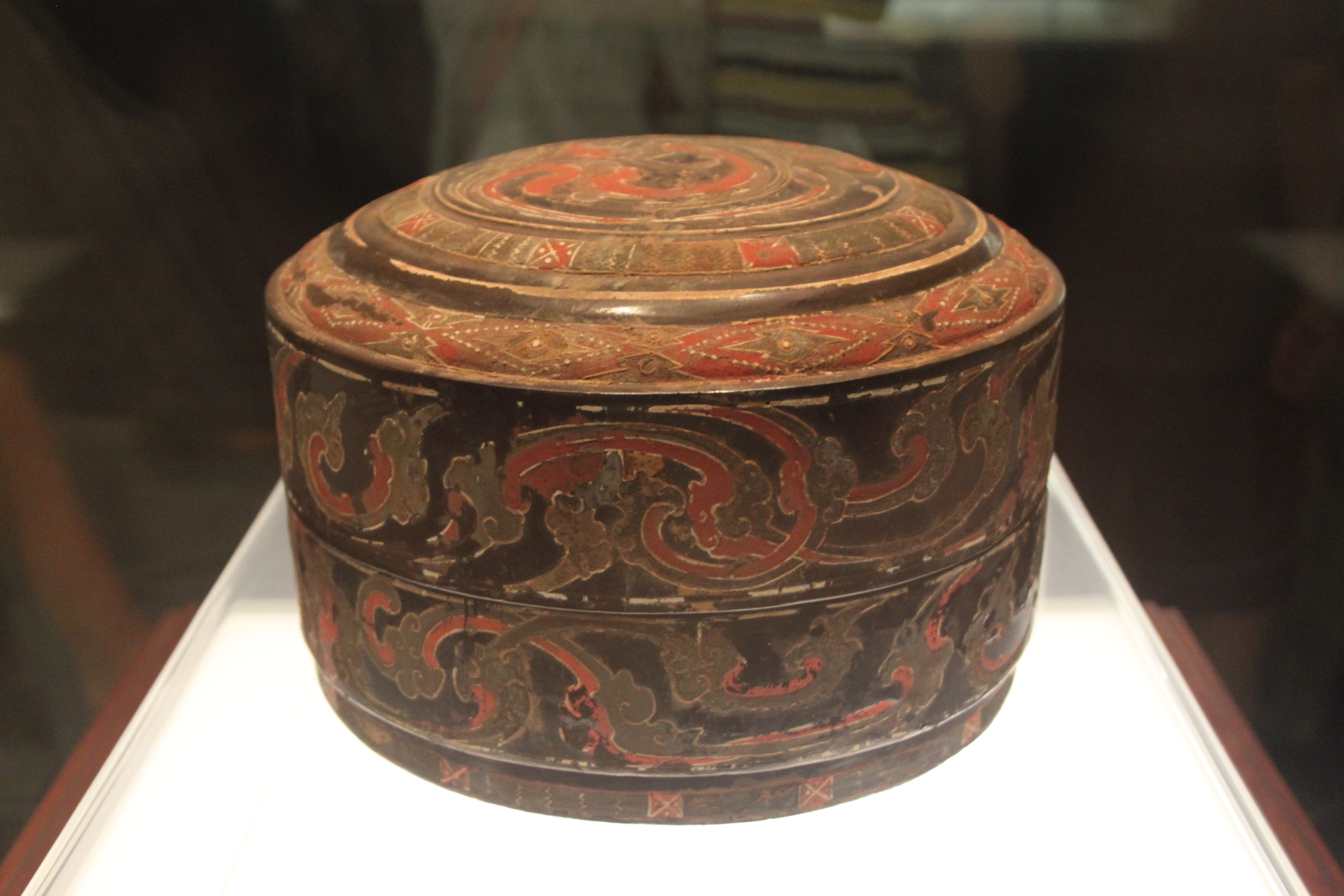
Lacquerware box from Mawangdui, Han dynasty.

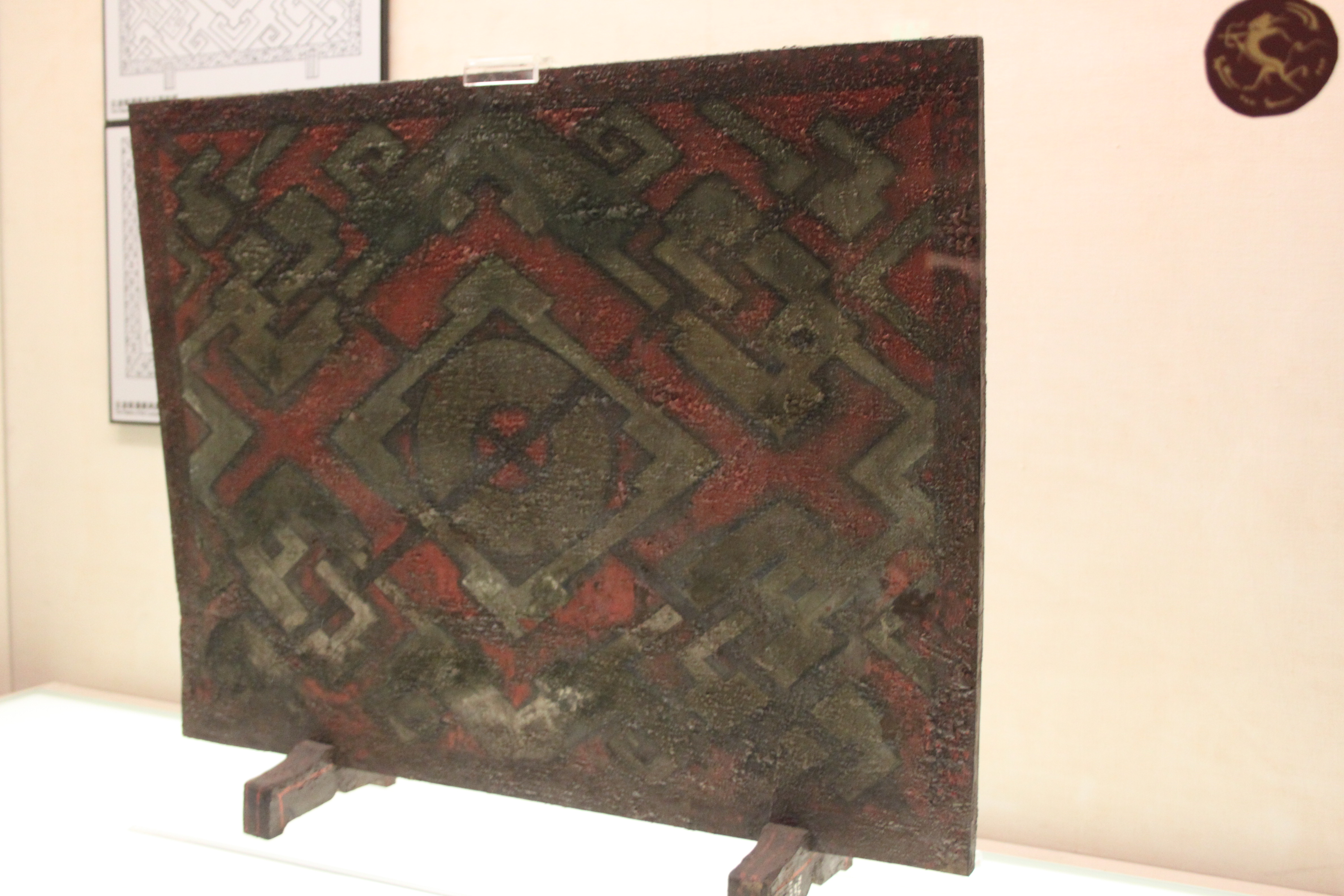
Lacquerware screen from Mawangdui, Han dynasty

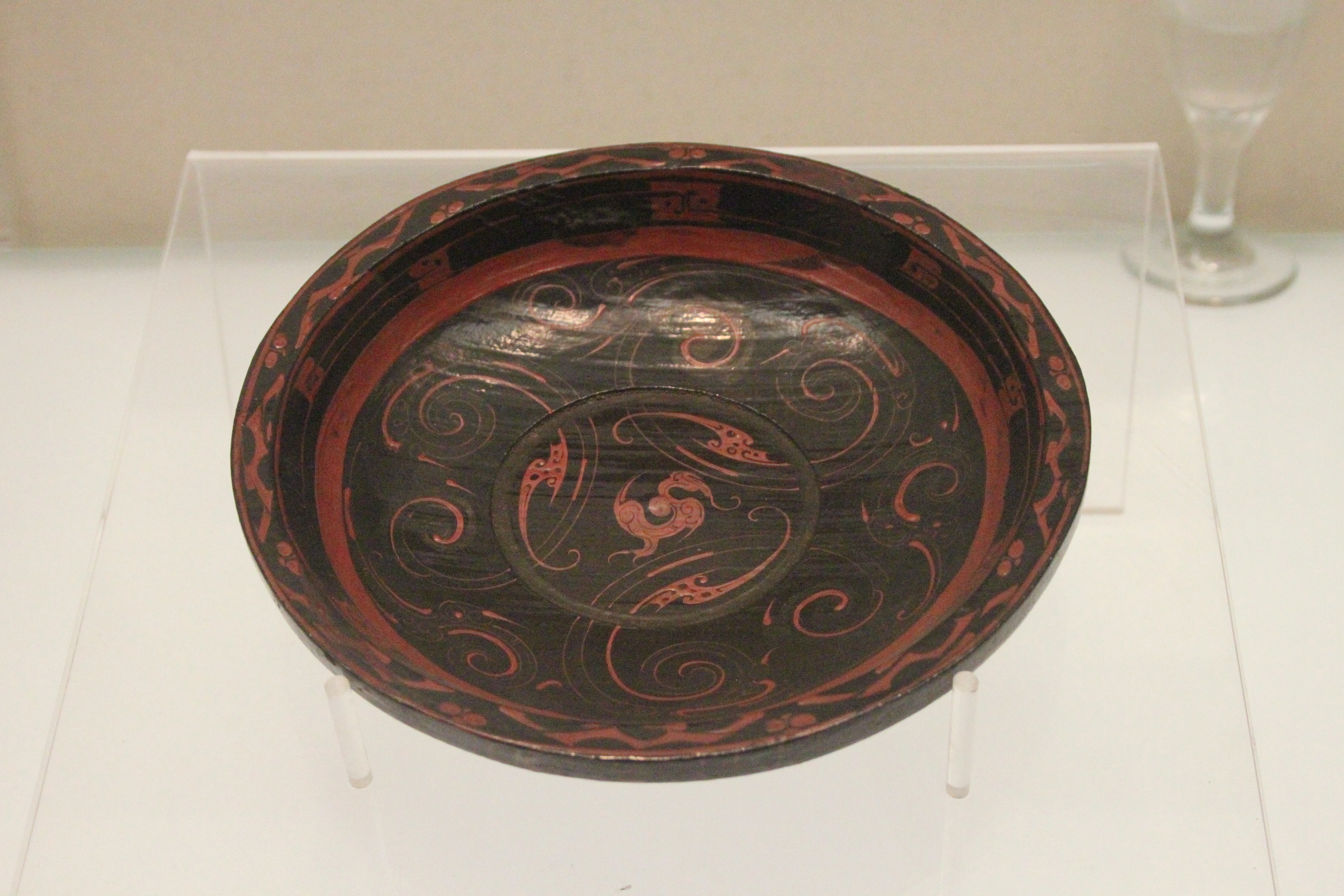
Lacquer dish, Han dynasty, Hubei Provincial Museum

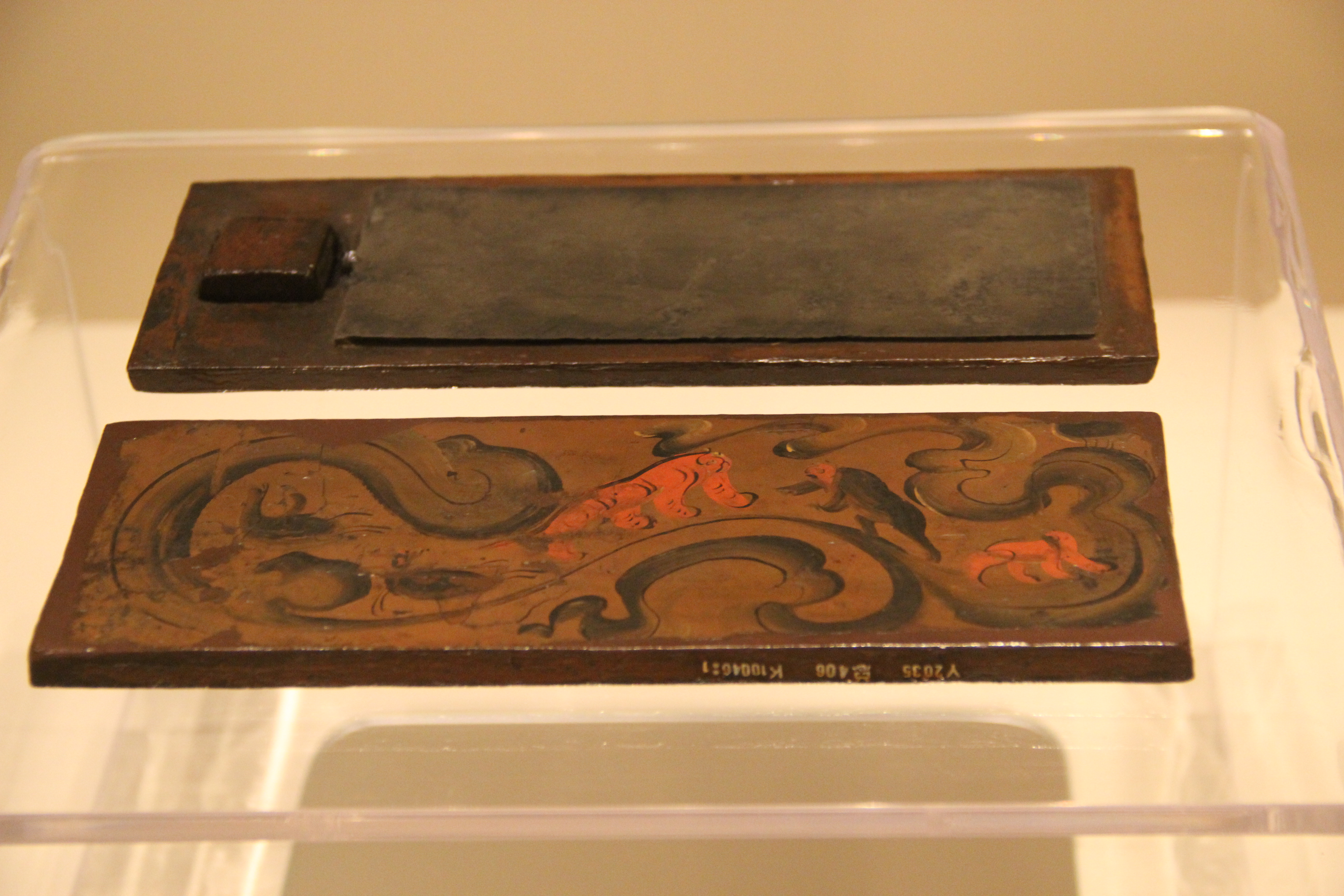
Inkstone and lacquer case, Zhou Family Tomb (周氏墓), Linyi, Shandong, Western Han dynasty

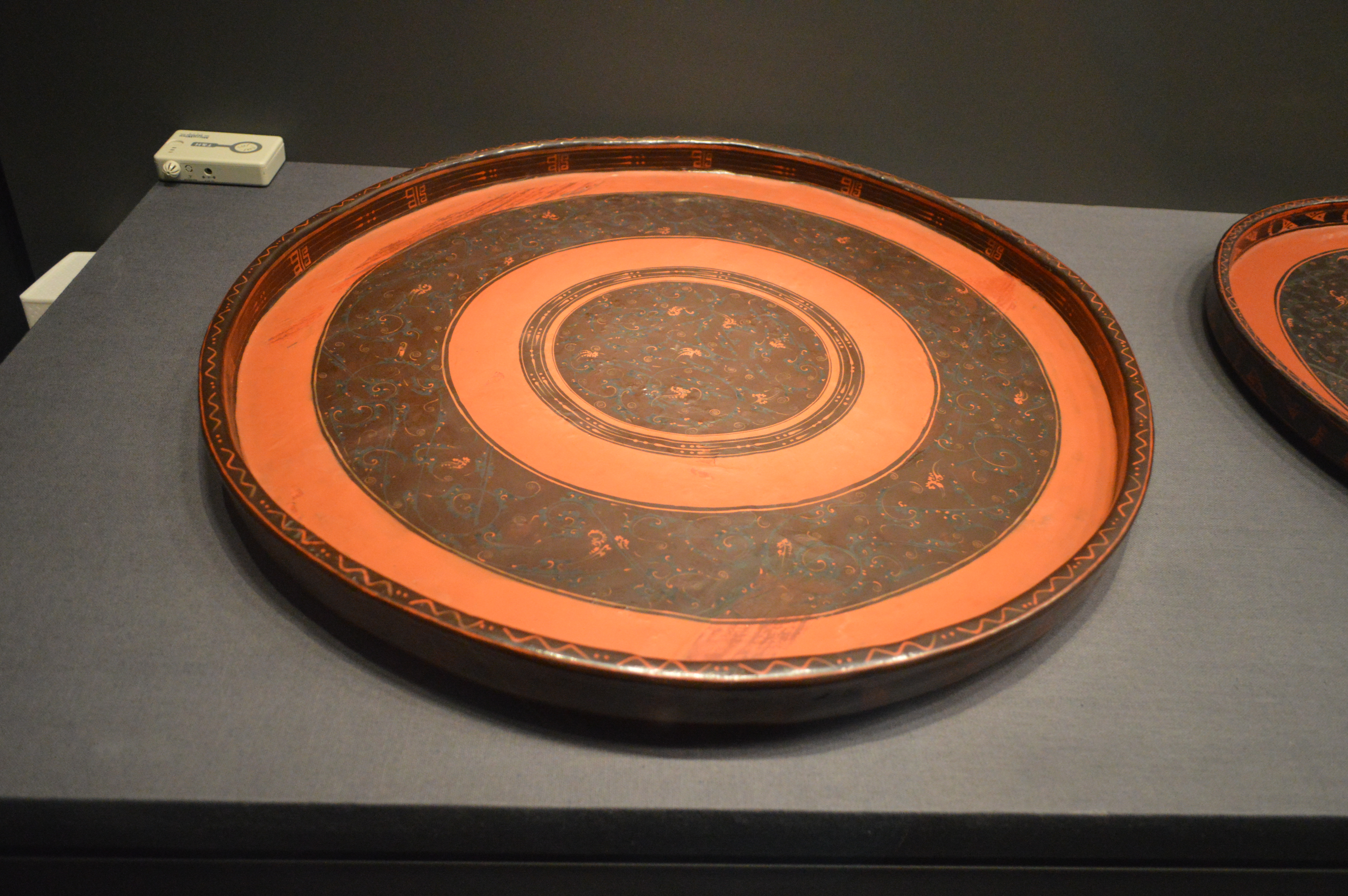
Lacquer dish with cloud-dragon design, Mawangdui, Han dynasty

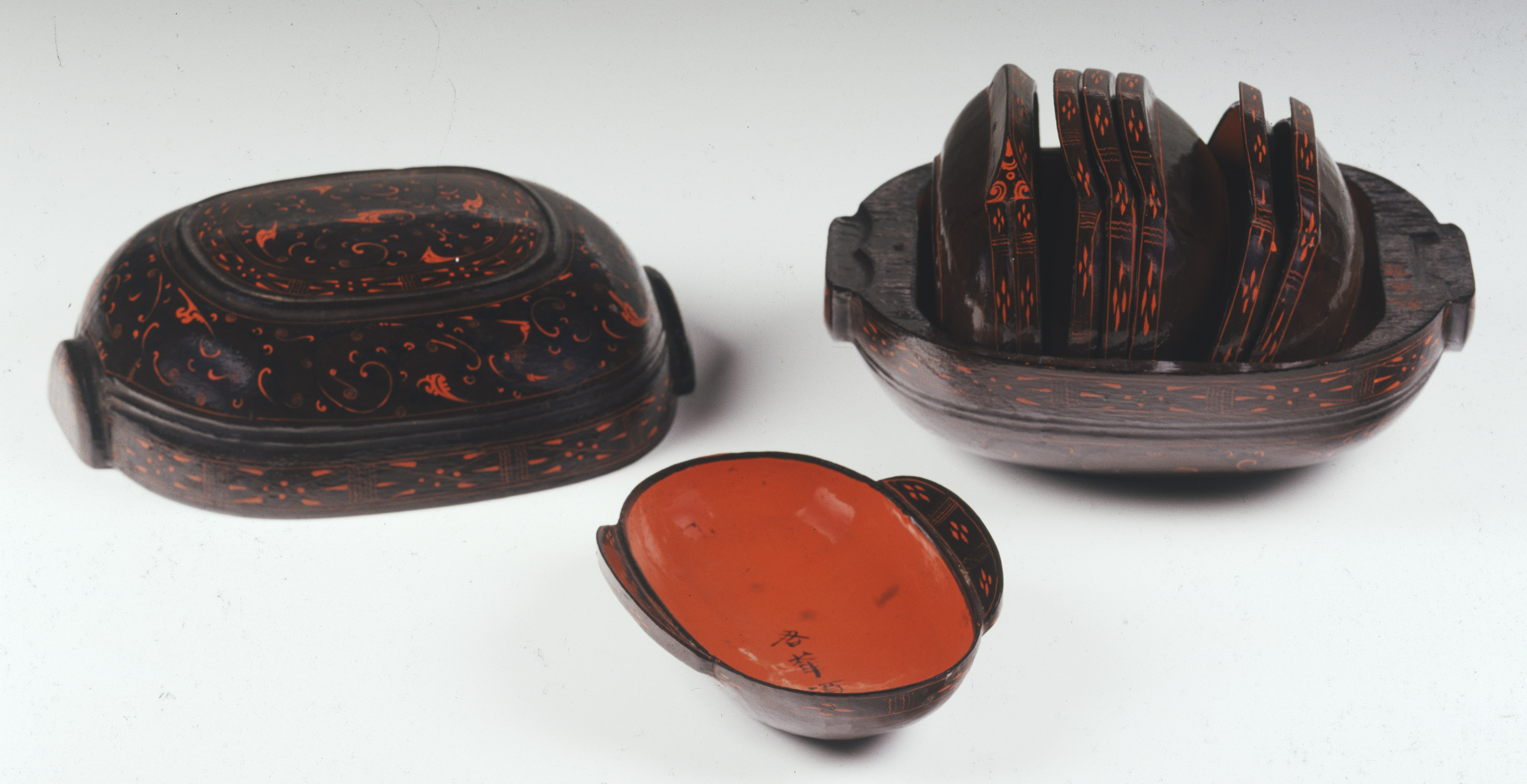
Lacquer Wine-Cup Container and wine cup set, Mawangdui, Han dynasty

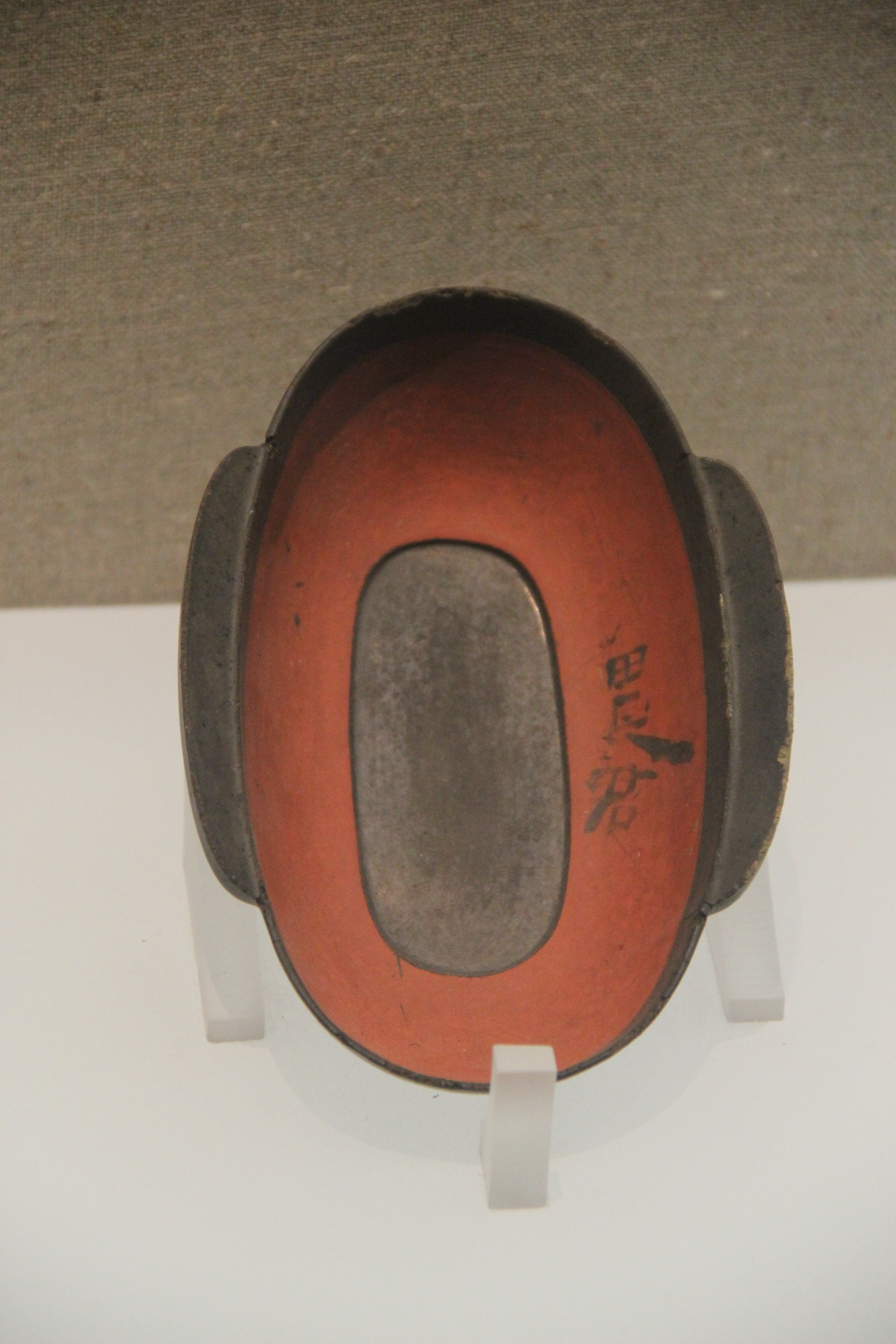
Western Han dynasty Lacquered flanged cup, known as winged goblet (zh:羽觞) or "eared cup"(耳杯) of Prince of Tianchang

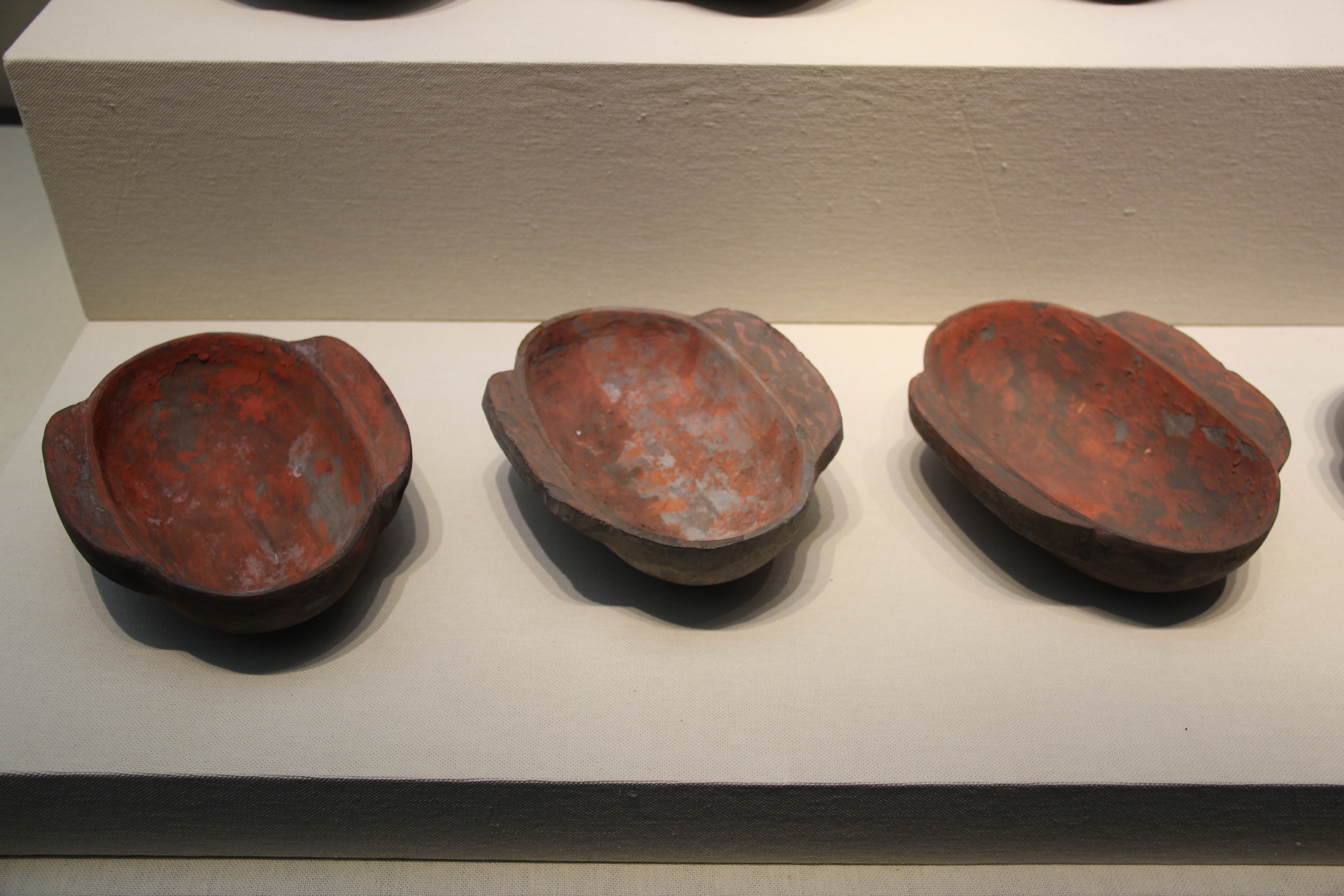
Lacquered pottery flanged or eared cup, Han dynasty, Hubei Provincial Museum

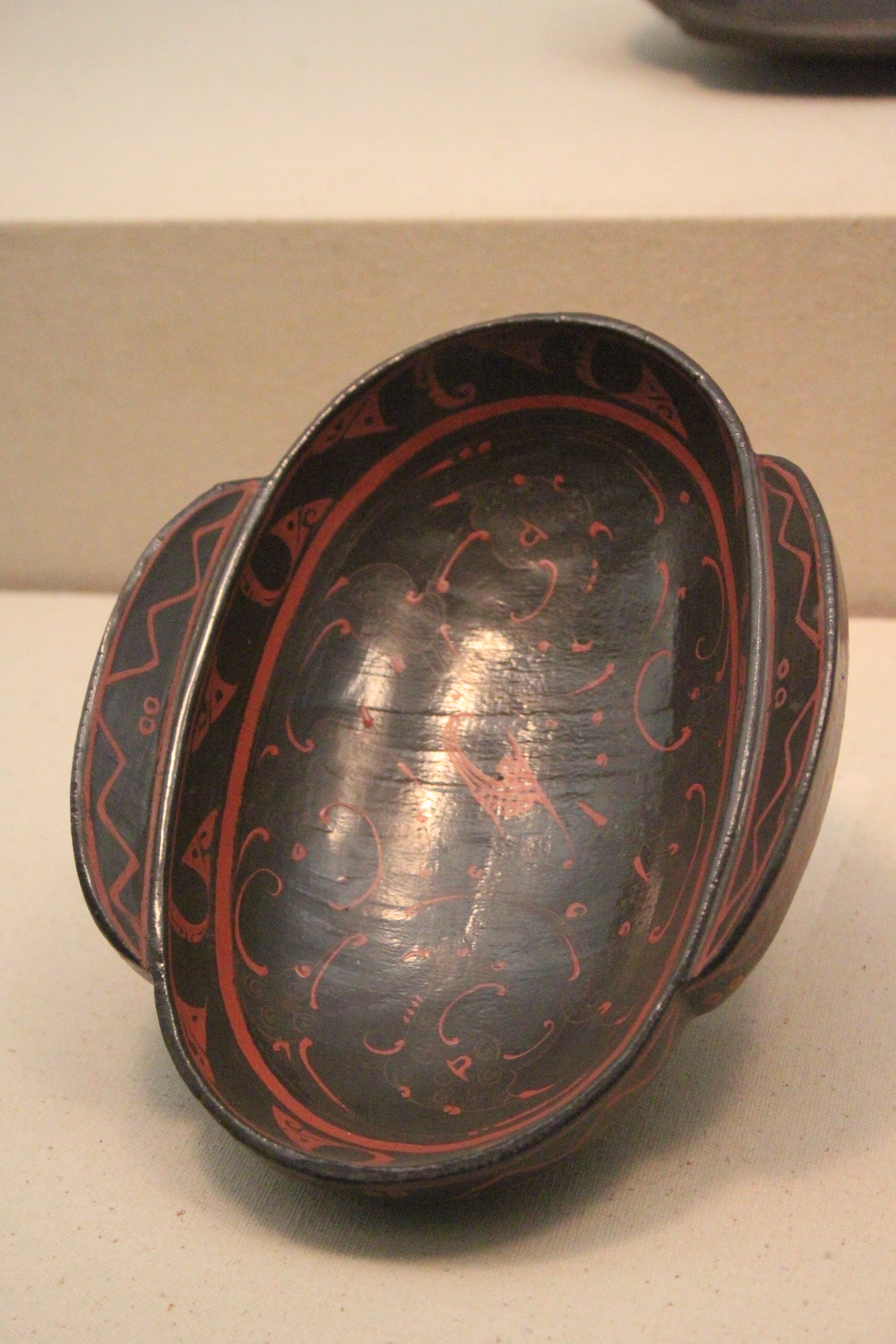
Lacquered flanged cup, known as winged goblet (zh:羽觞), Han dynasty, Hubei Provincial Museum

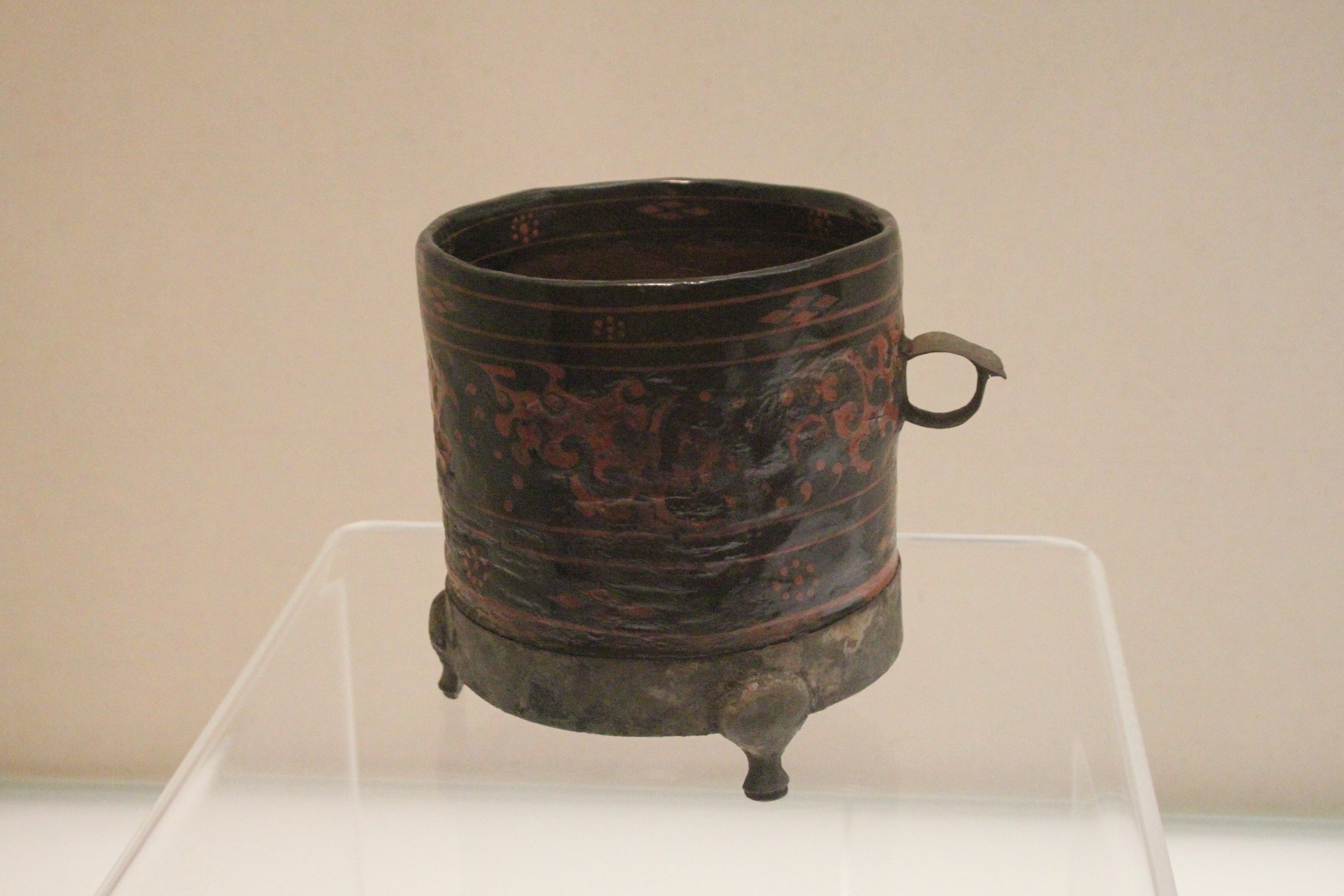
Lacquered zun, Han dynasty, Hubei Provincial Museum

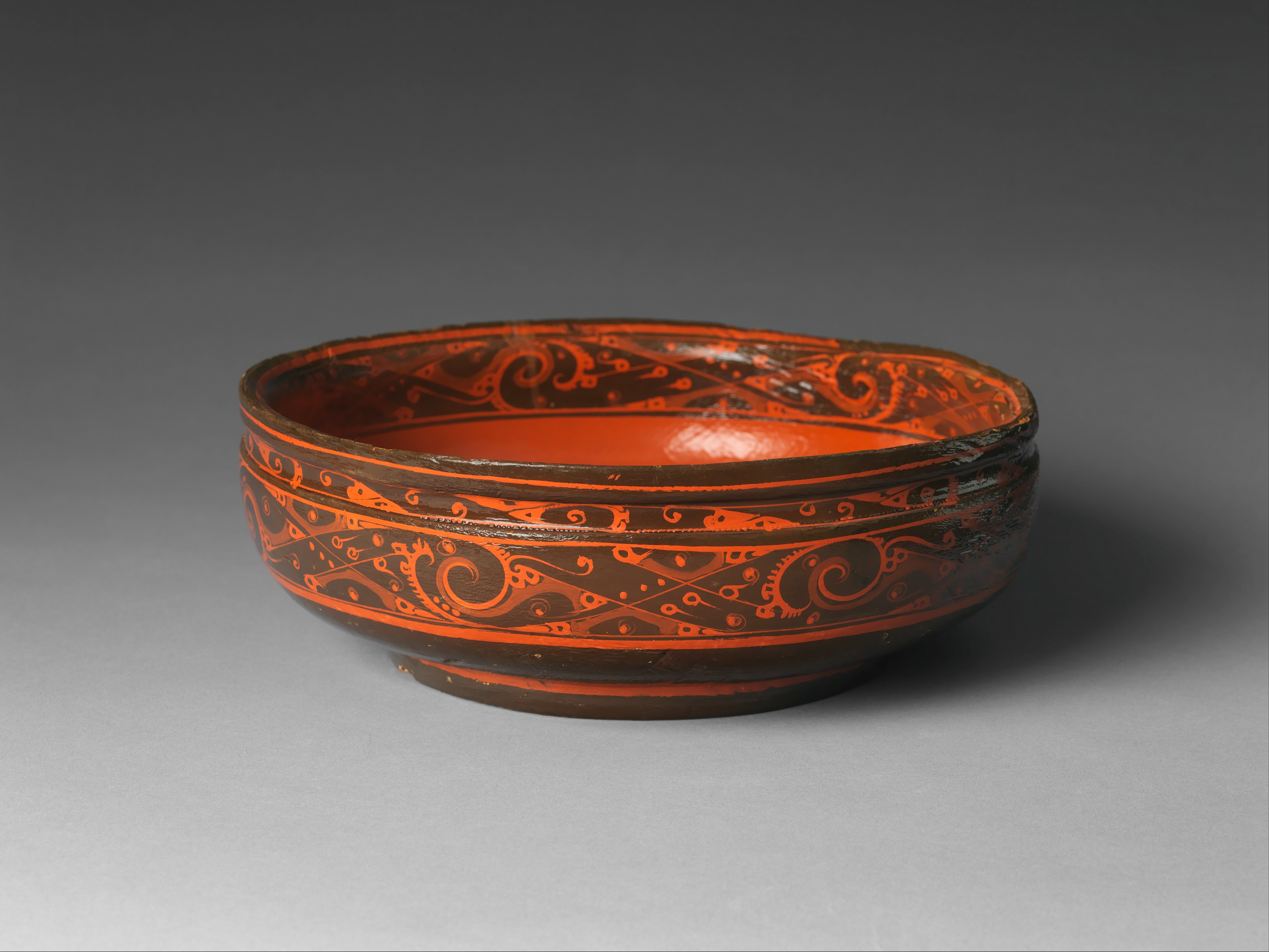
Western Han dynasty lacquer bowl

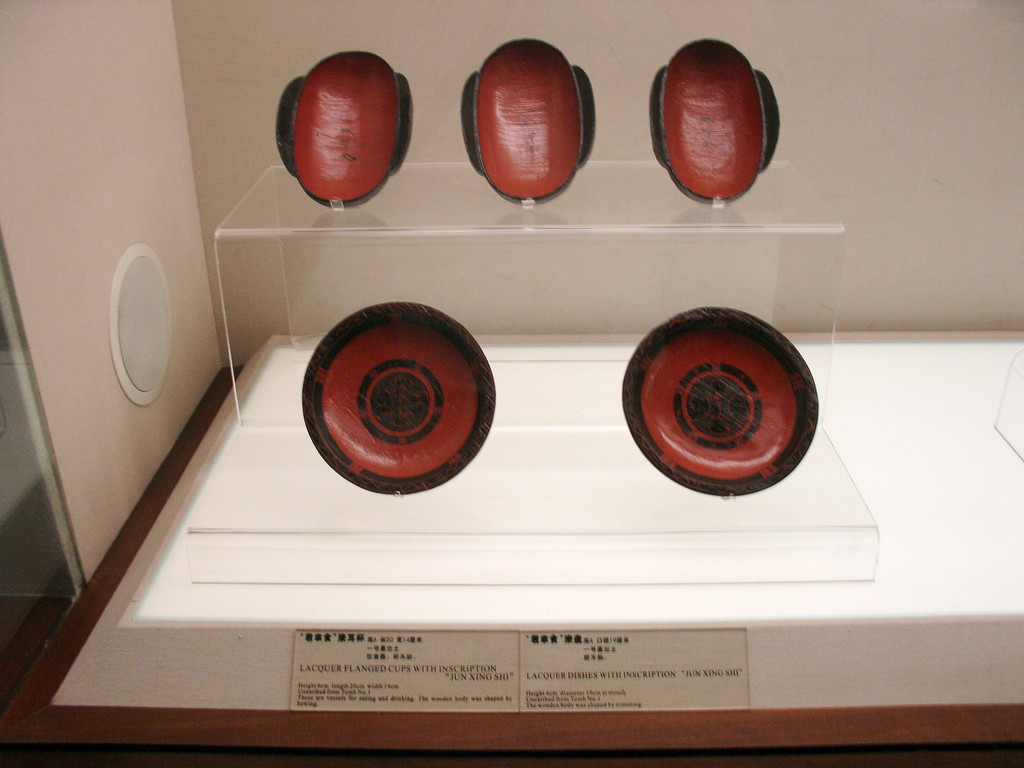
Lacquer flanged cups and dishes from Mawangdui, Han dynasty

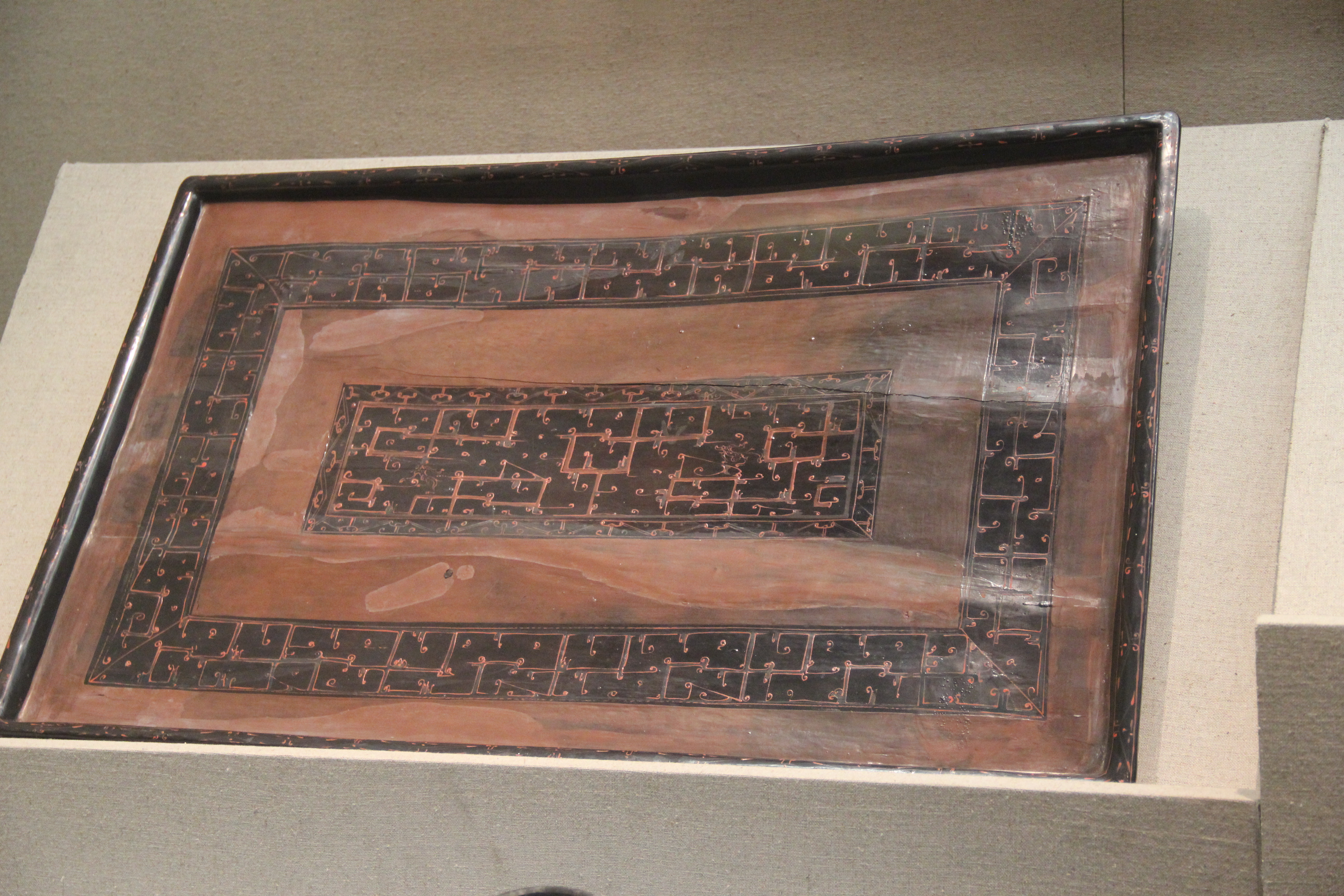
Lacquered table, Western Han dynasty, Anhui Provincial Museum

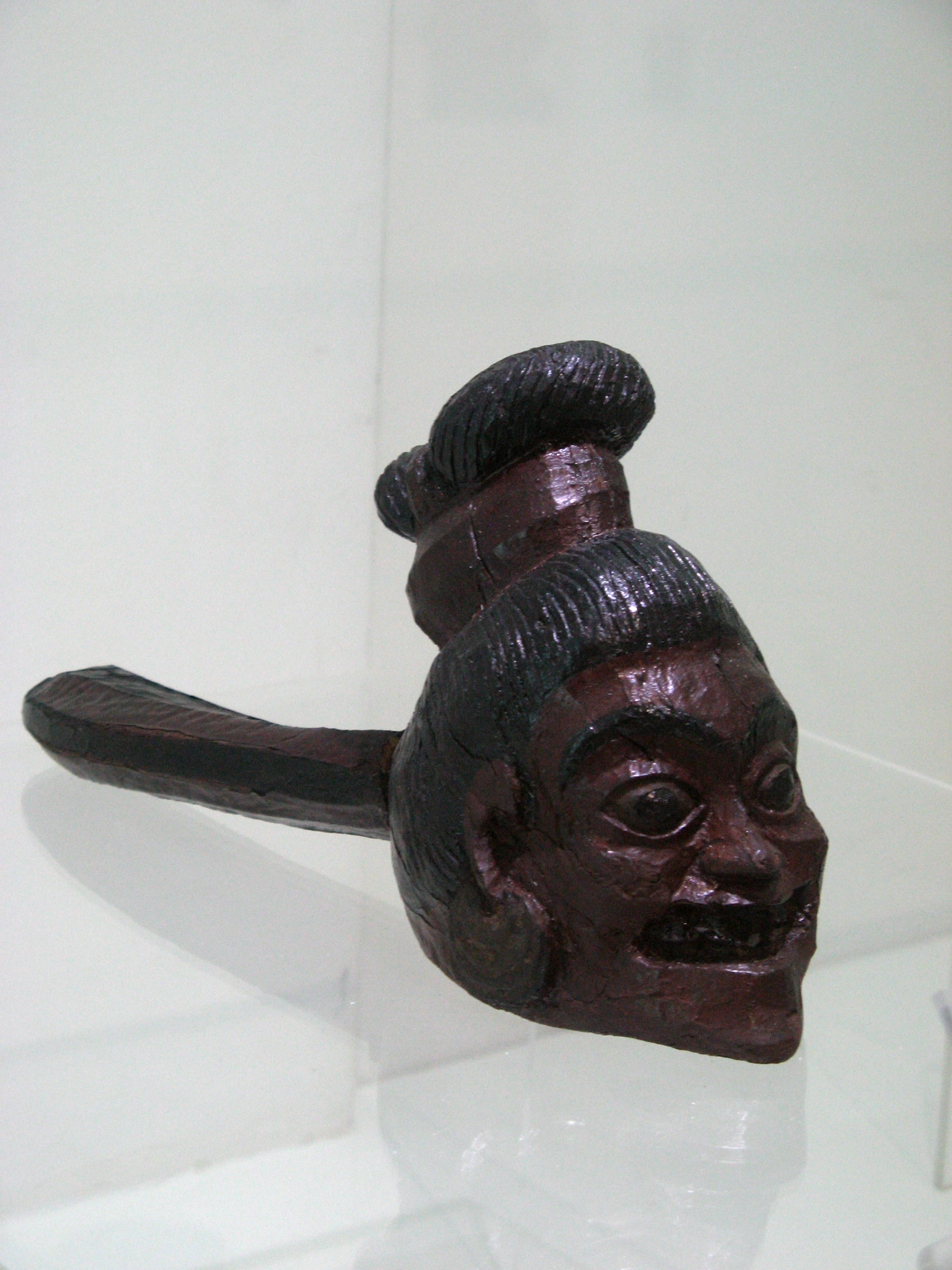
Lacquerware in the shape of a man's head, Western Han (202 BC – 9 AD), Yunnan Provincial Museum, Kunming

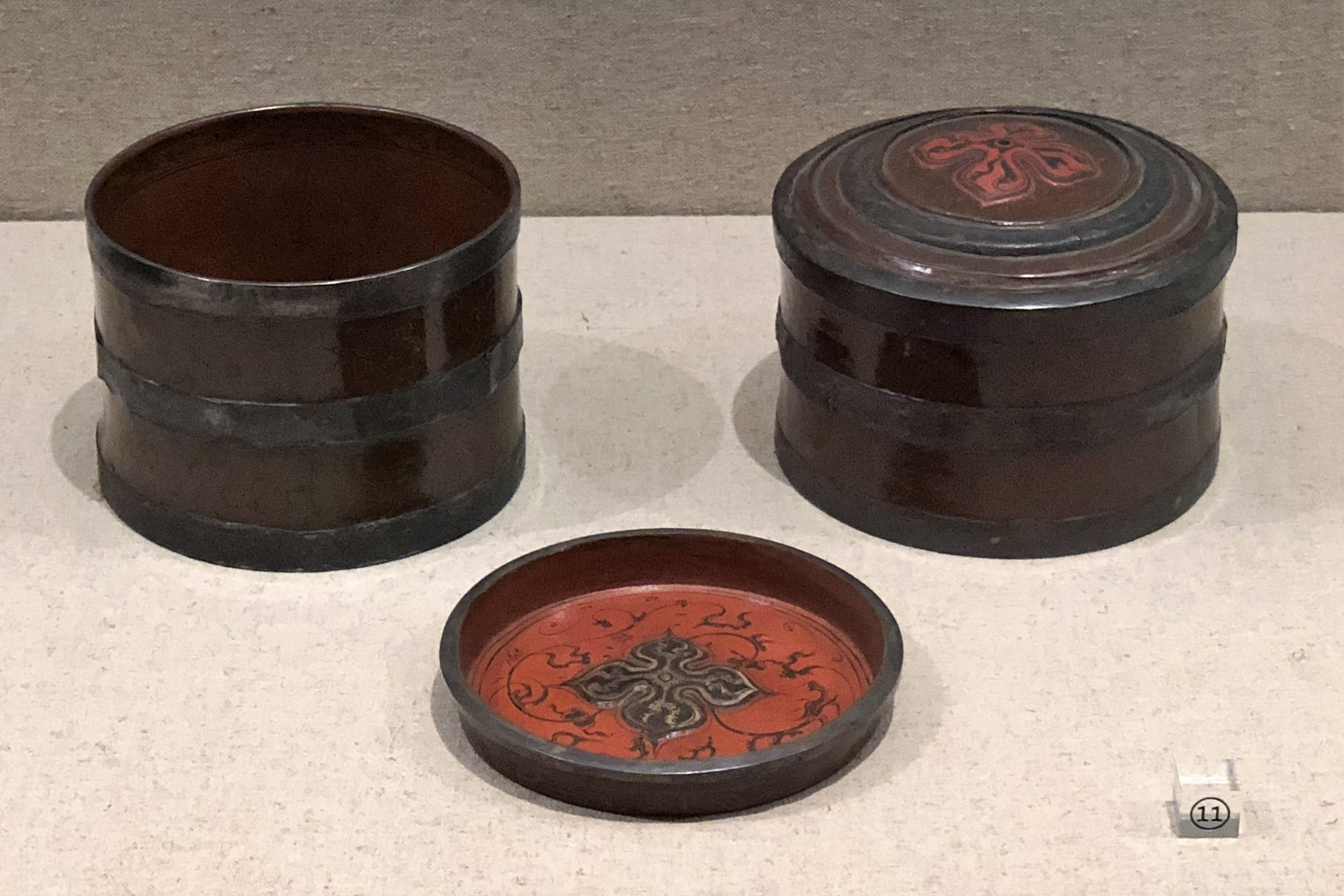
Lacquer dressing case painted with dragon pattern, Chuzhou, Anhui, Han dynasty

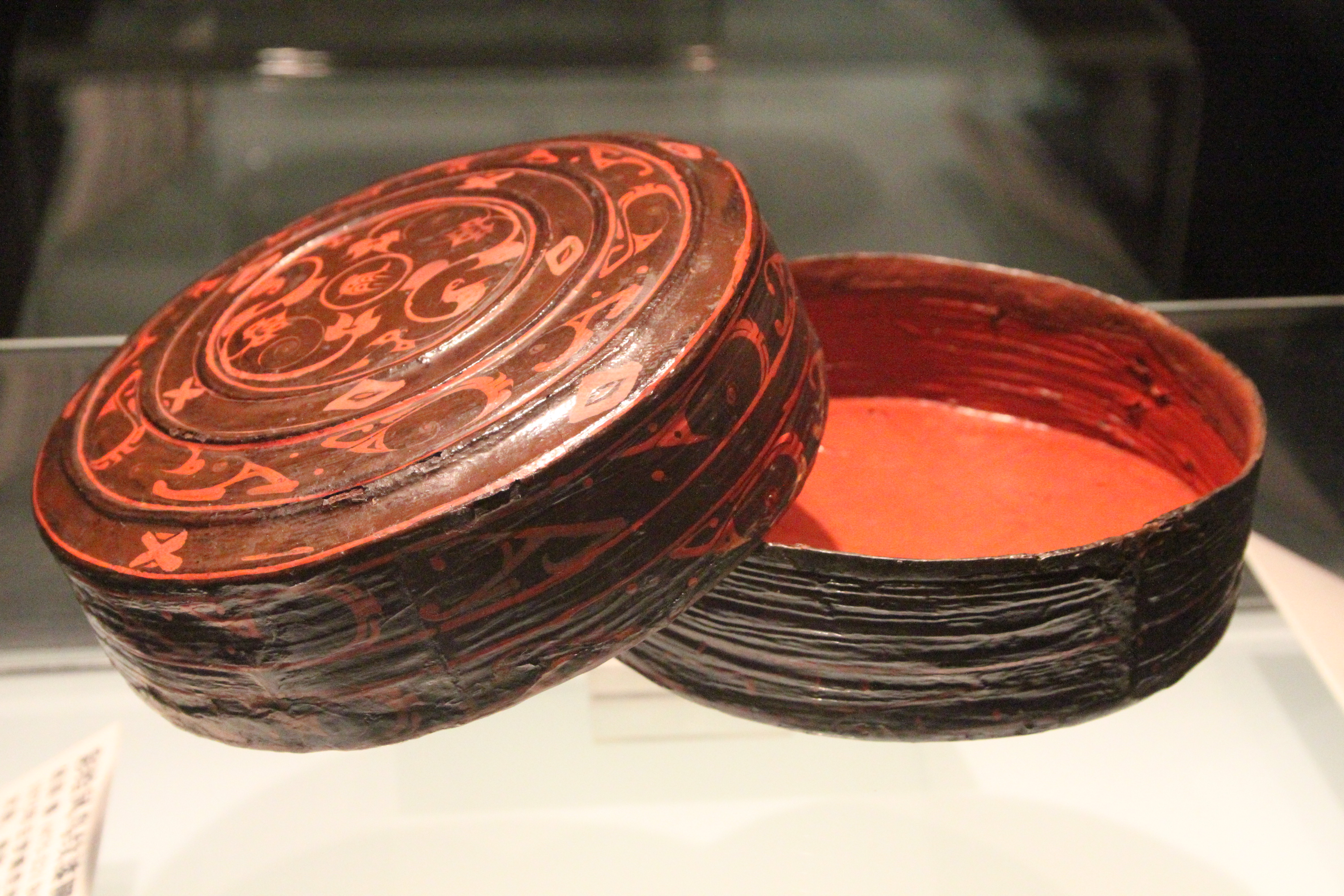
Lacquered case, Han dynasty, Hubei Provincial Museum

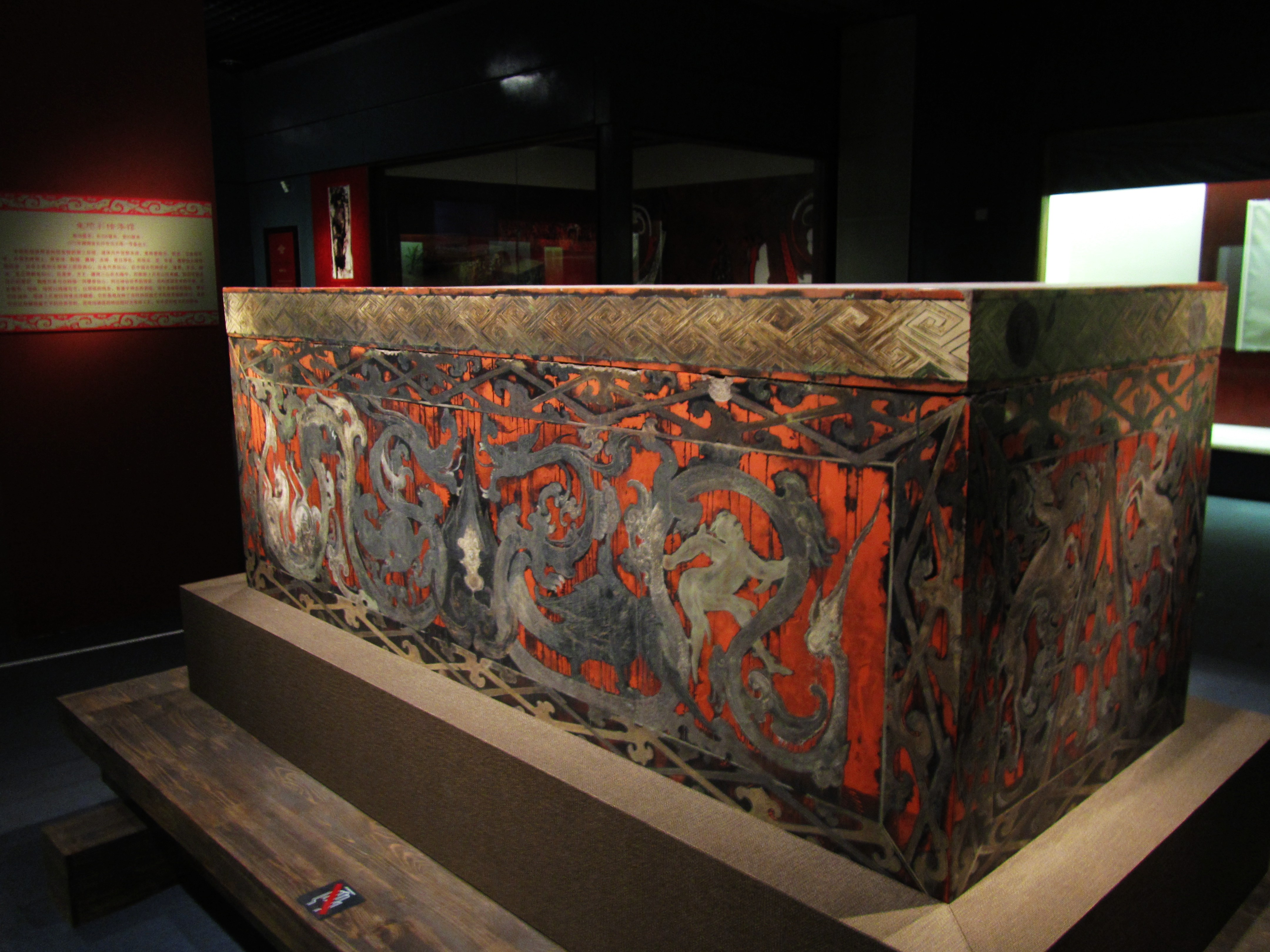
Lacquerware coffin of Mawangdui, Han dynasty

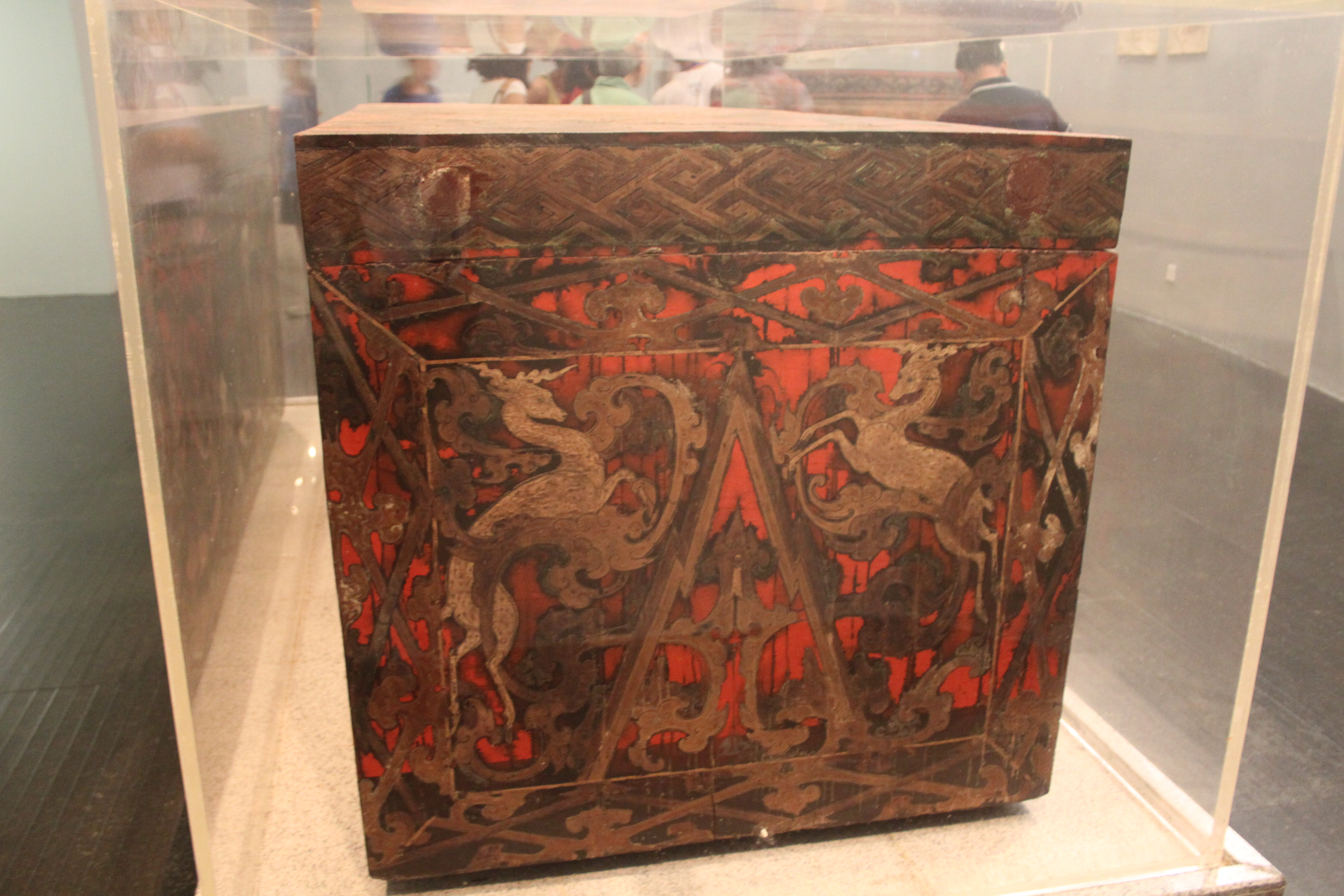
Second coffin of Mawangdui, Han dynasty

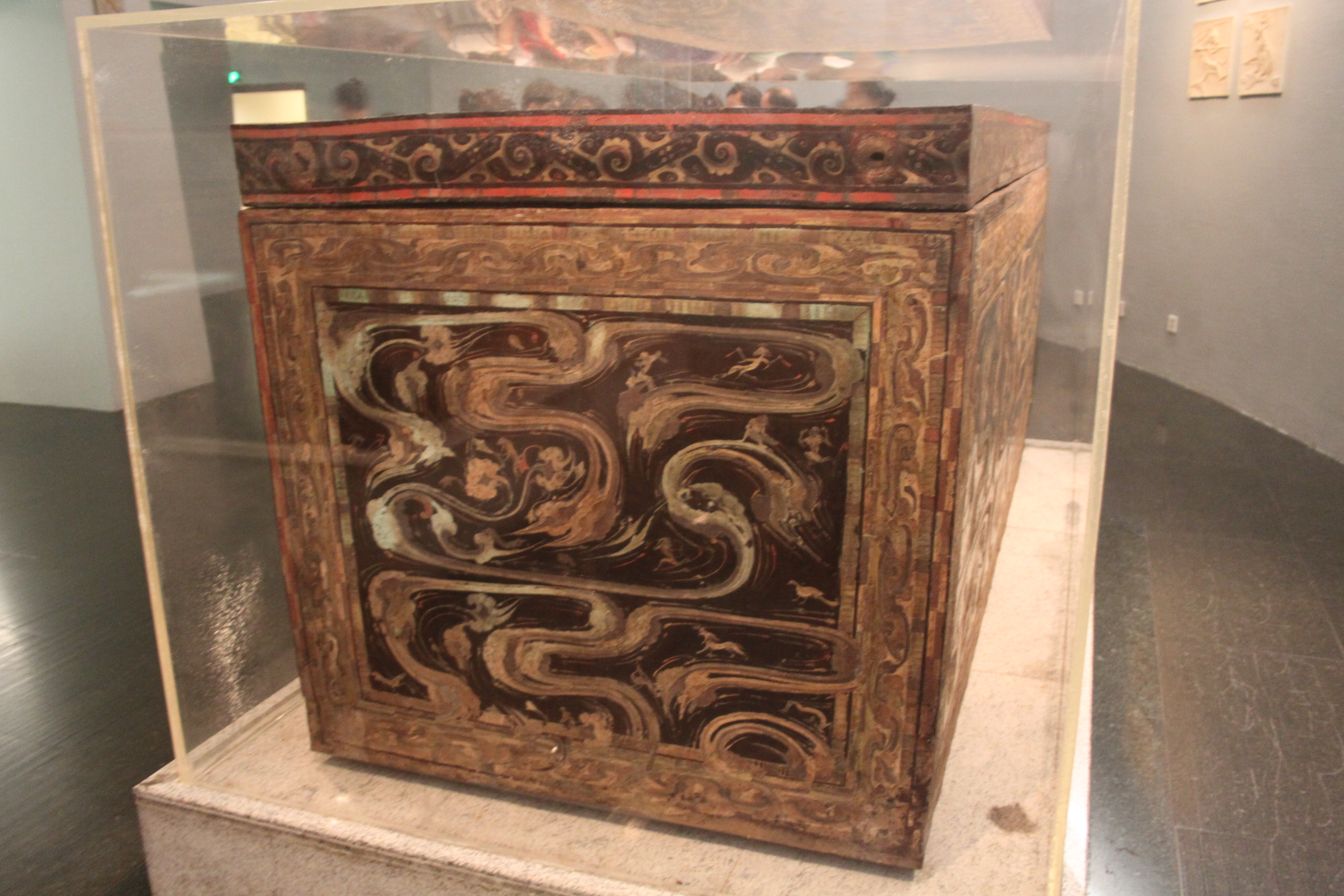
Third coffin of Mawangdui, Han dynasty

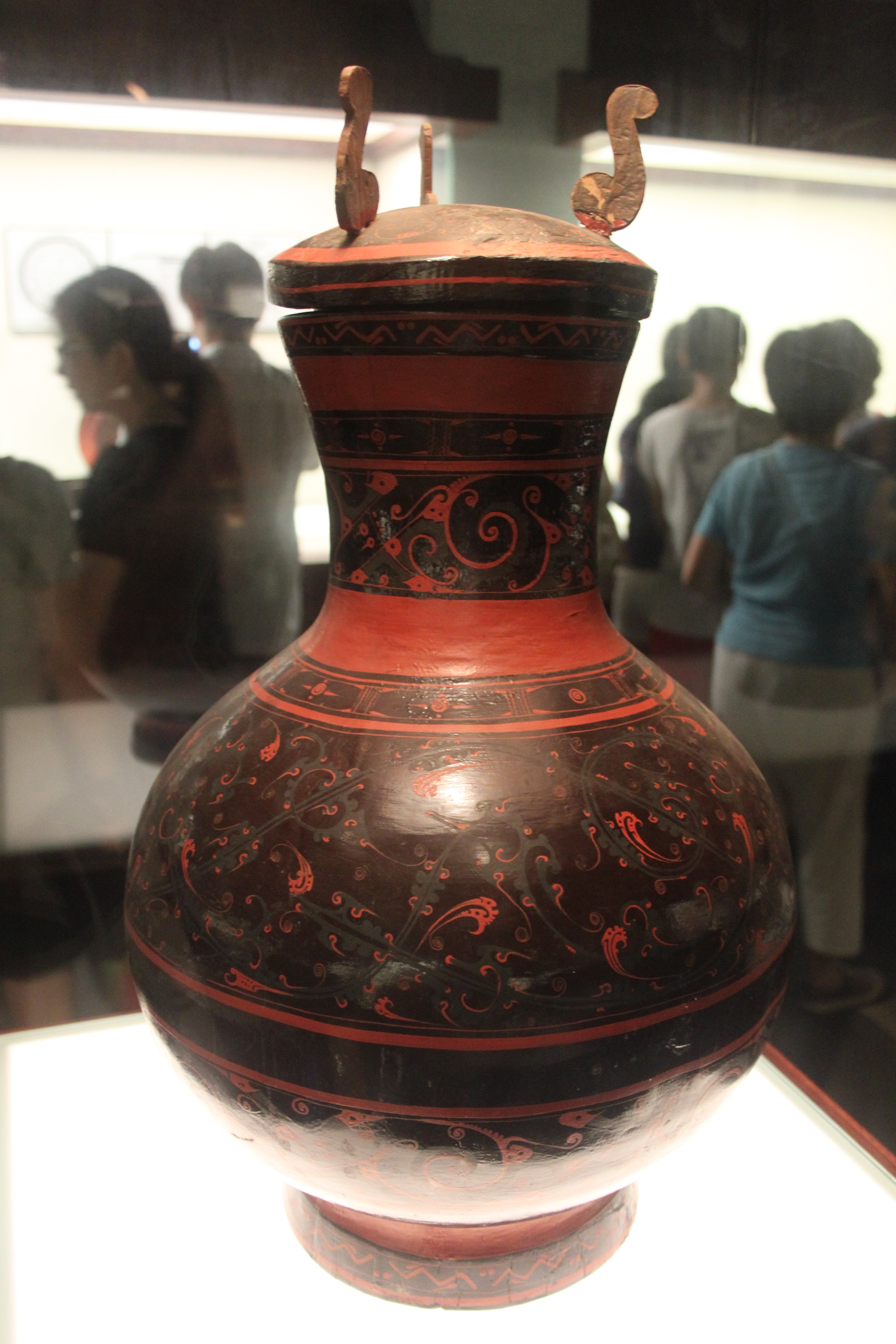
Lacquerware pot from Mawangdui Tomb.

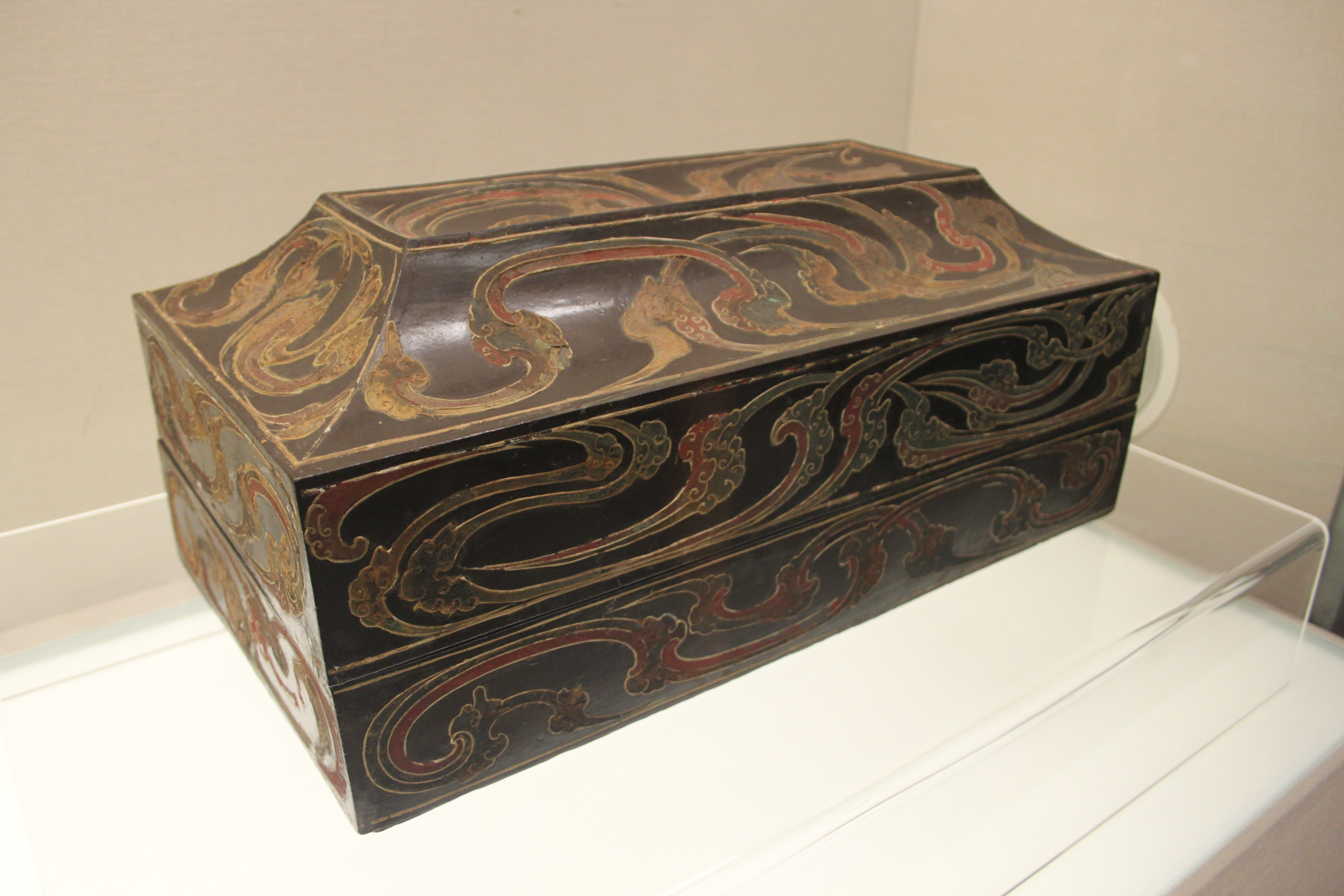
Lacquered chest from Mawangdui.

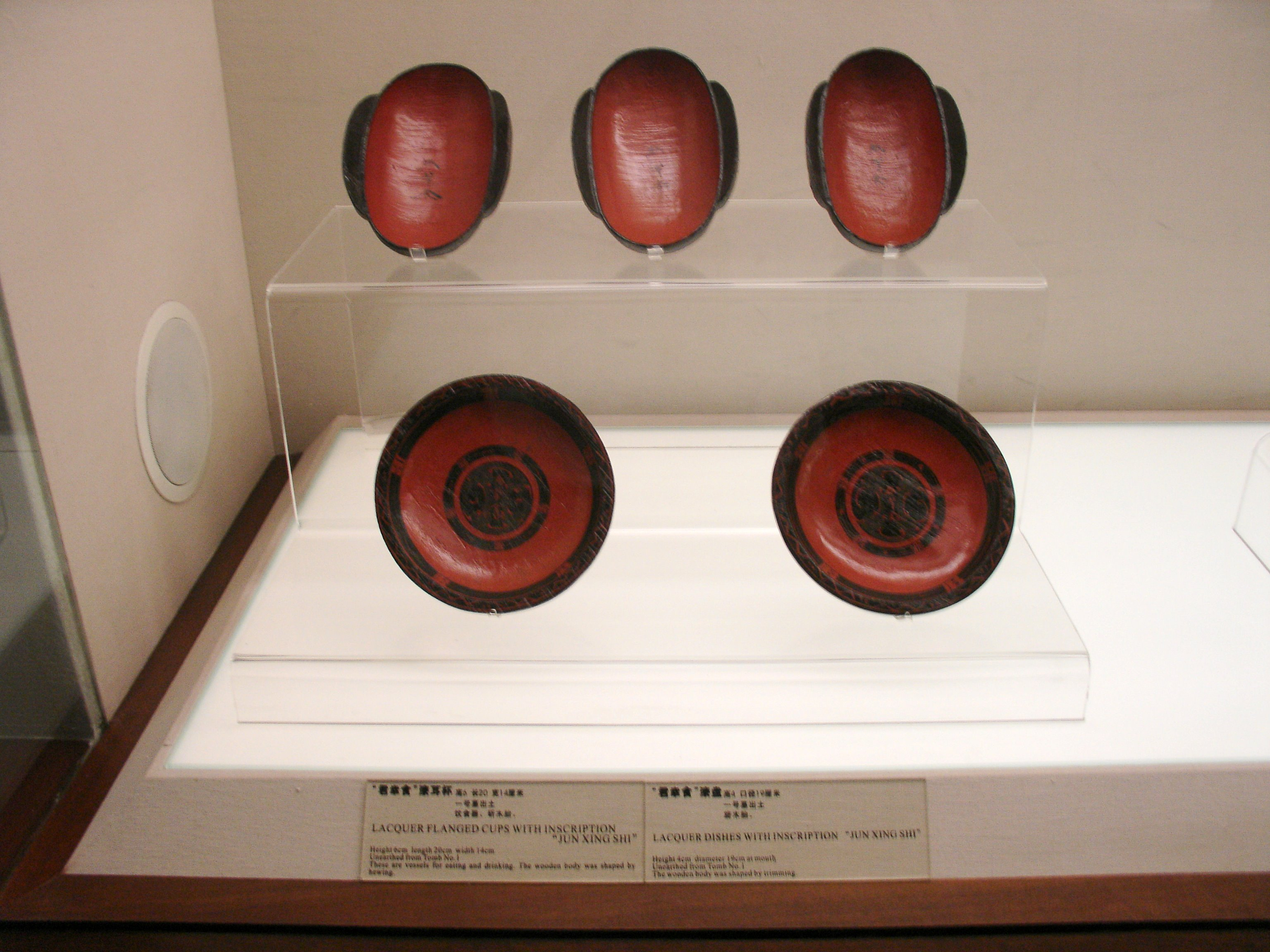
Lacquerware flanged drinking vessels and plates from the Mawangdui Tomb.

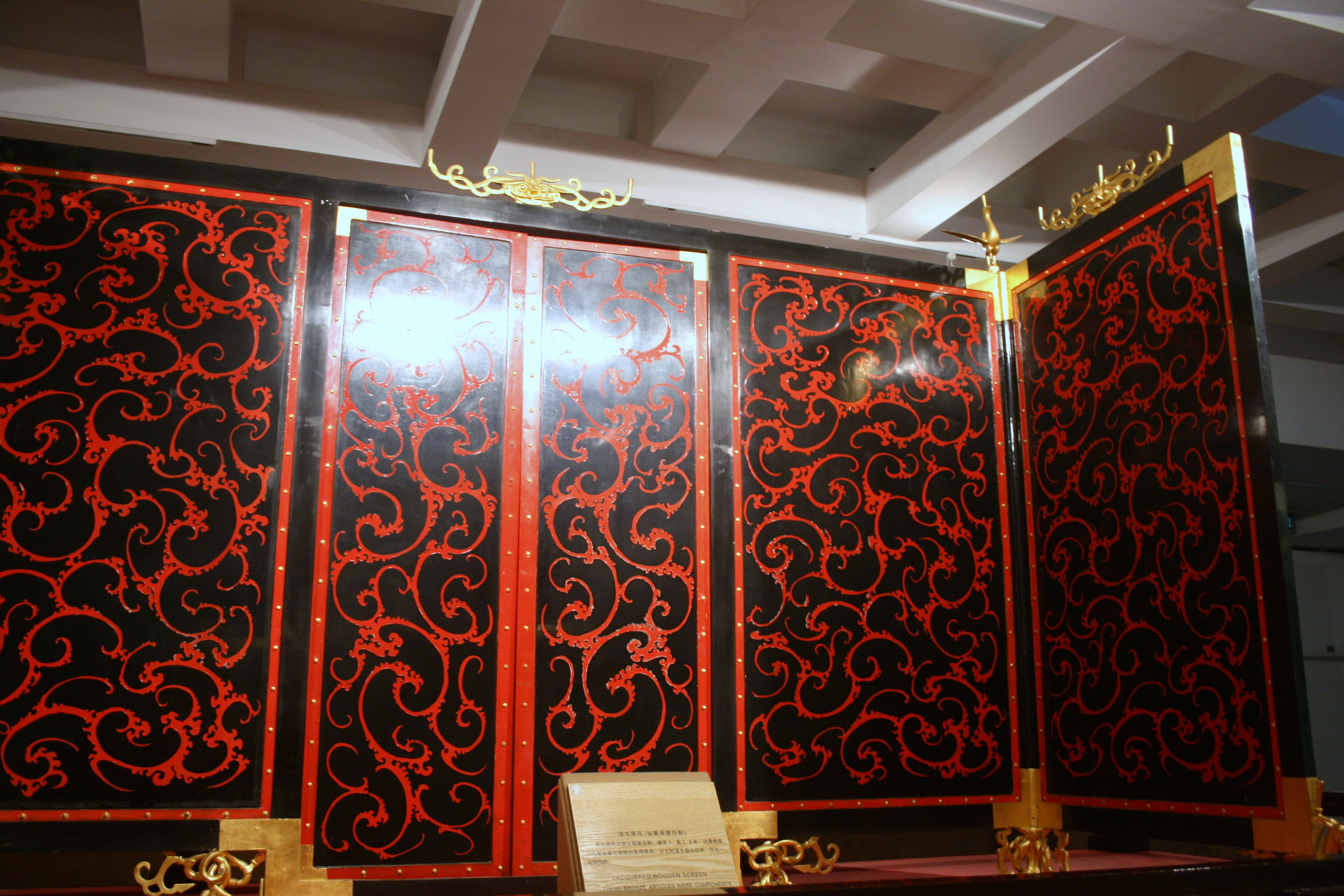
Lacquerware screen from the tomb of Zhao Mo, King of Nanyue (reconstruction)

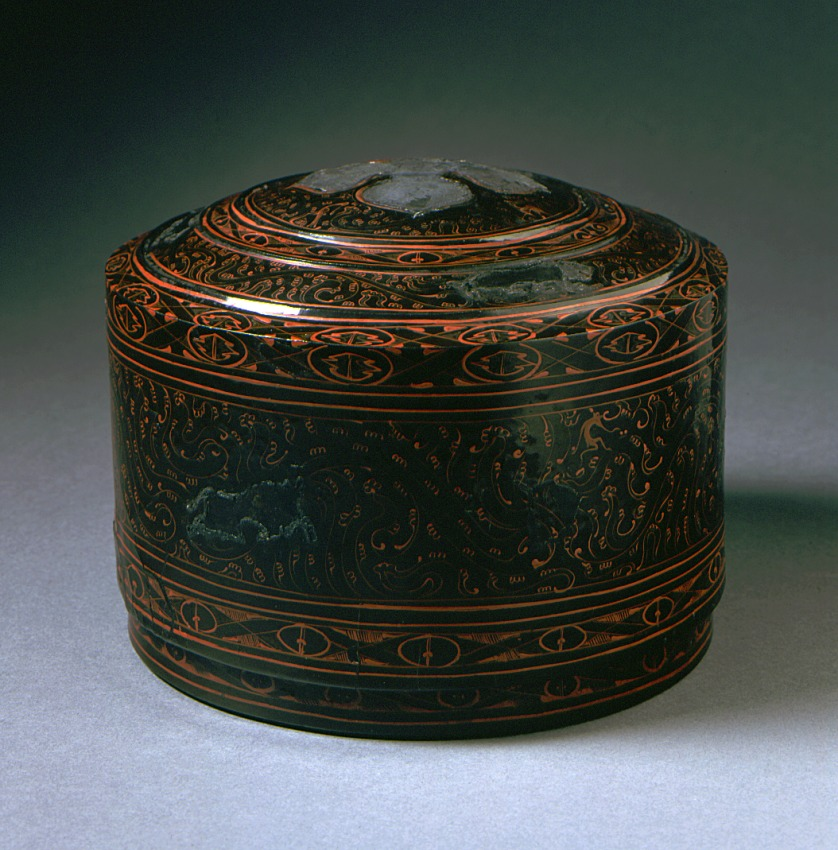
Lidded cosmetic box, late Western Han dynasty, about 100 BC – 25 AD

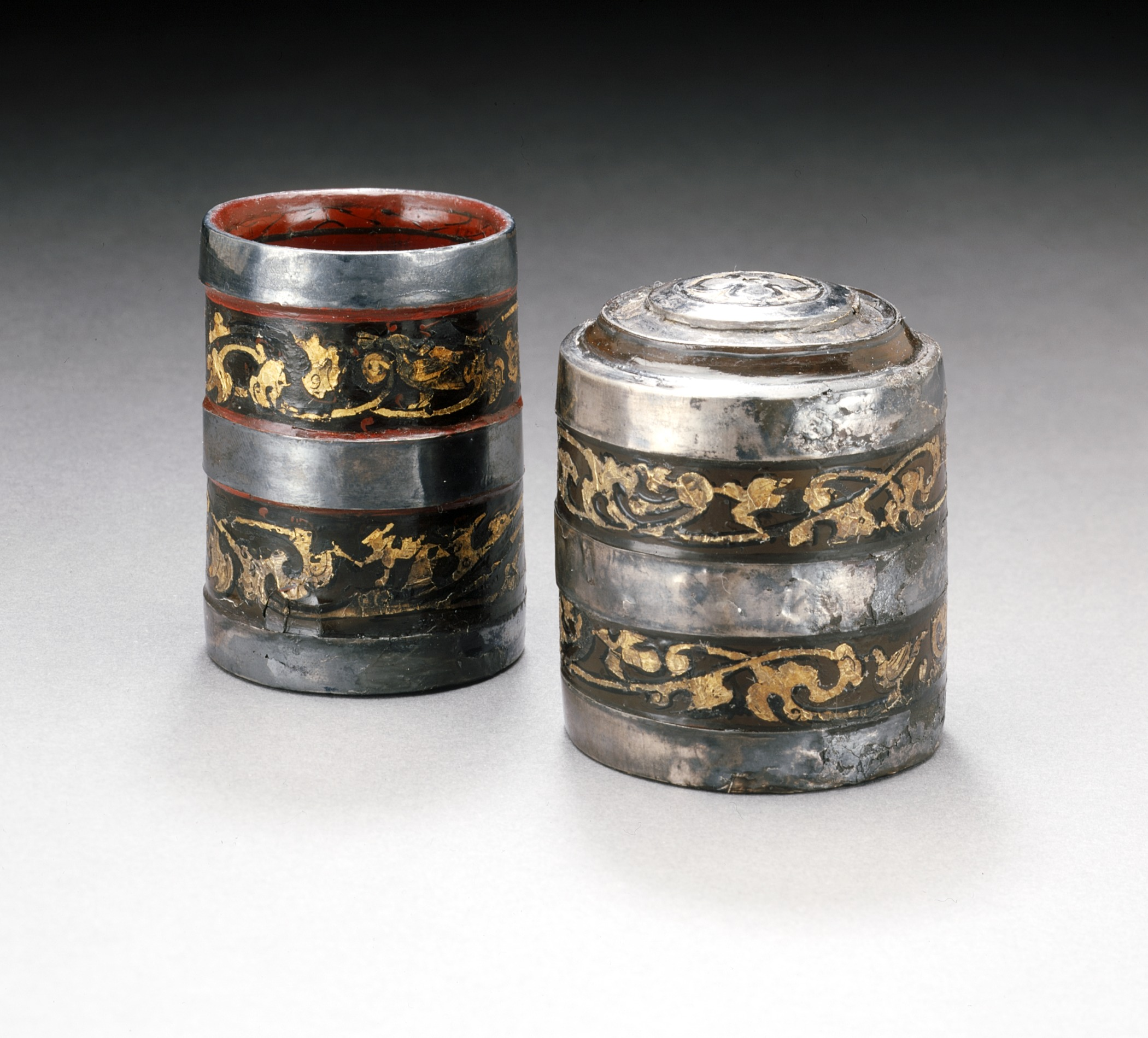
Lacquered cosmetic box, late Western Han dynasty

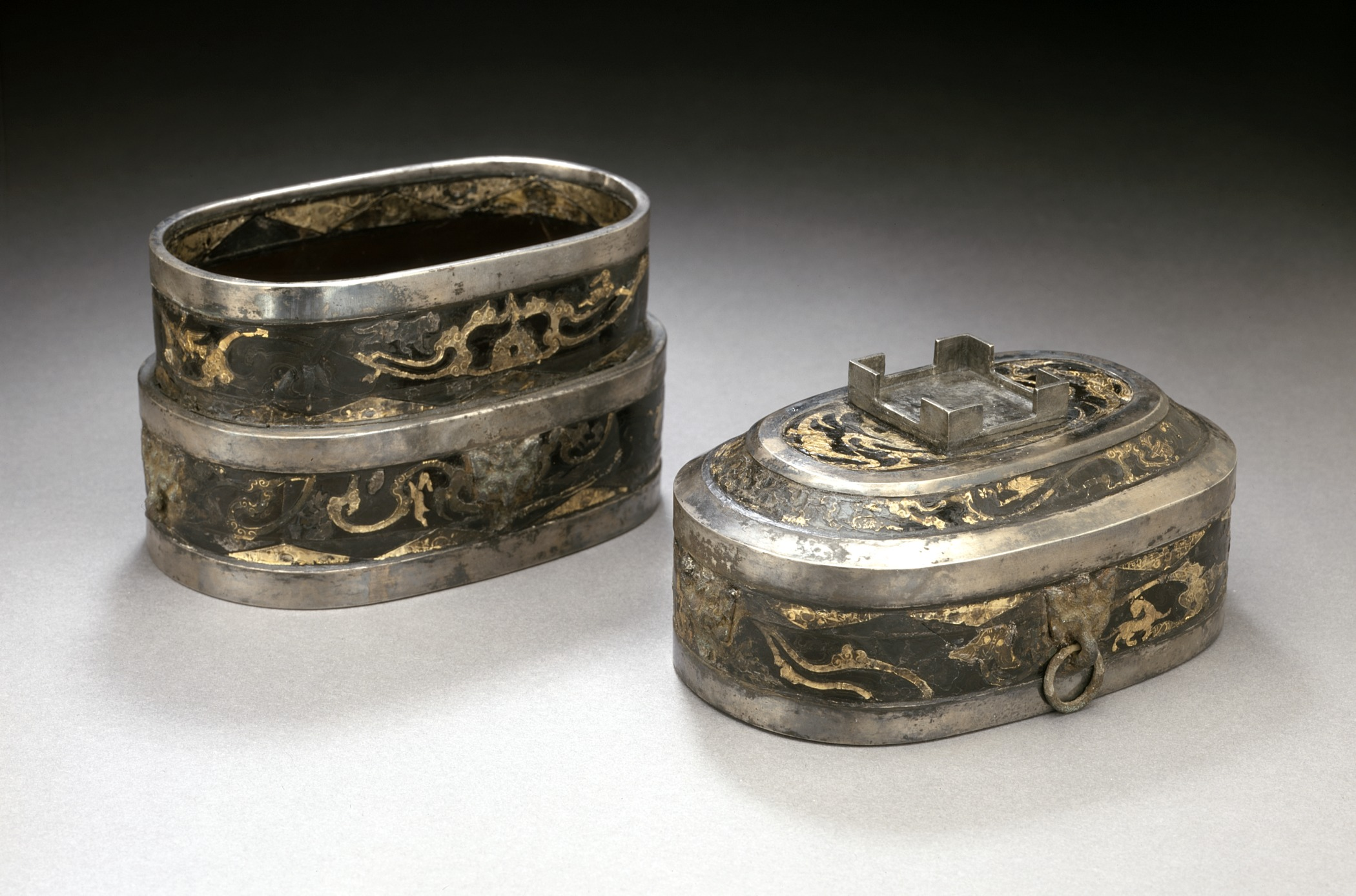
Oval Lidded Cosmetic Box (Duoyuan He) with Scrolling Clouds, Animals, and Birds, late Western Han dynasty

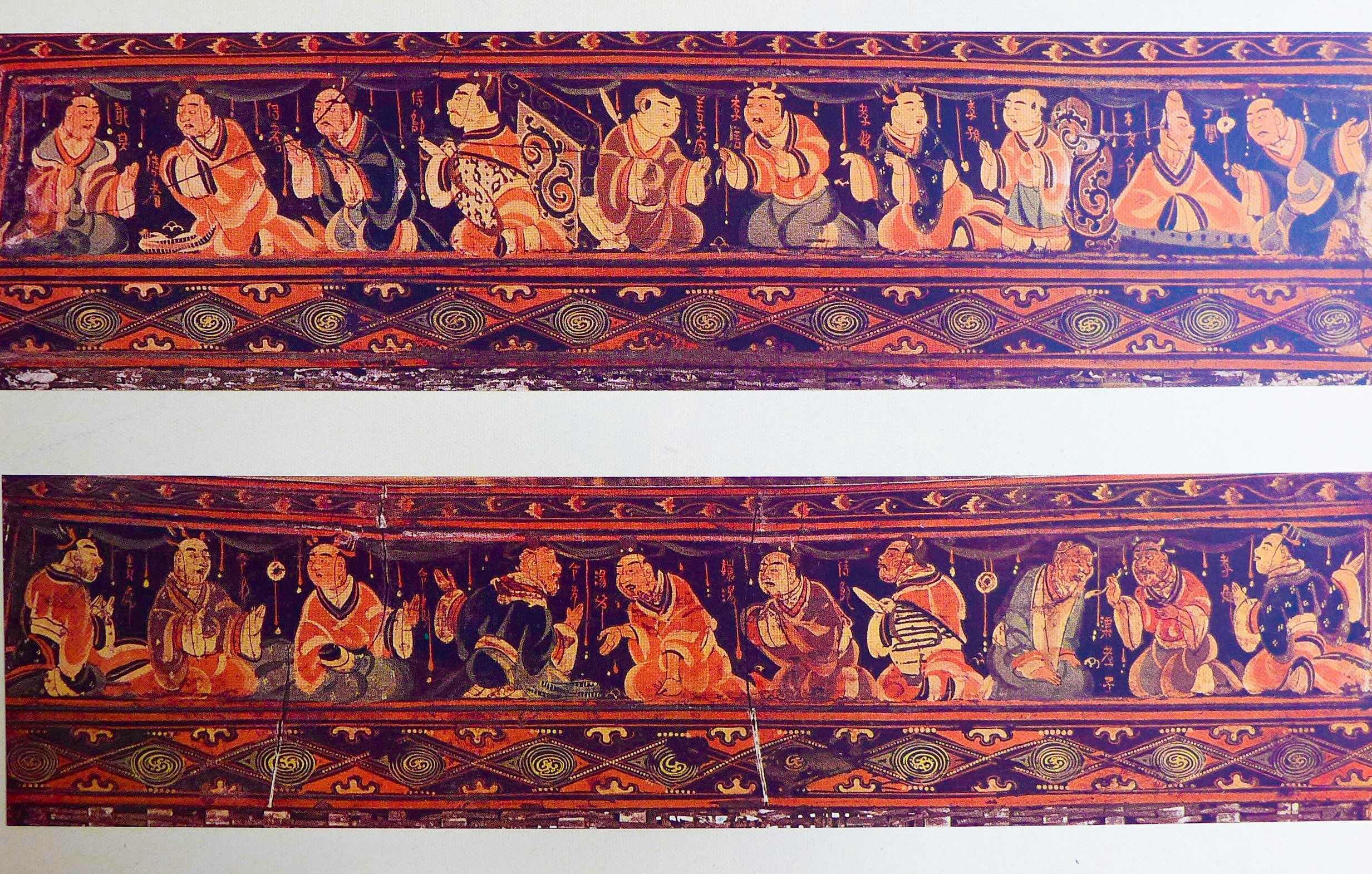
Chinese painted artwork on the lacquered basket of Lelang, a region of the Han dynasty.

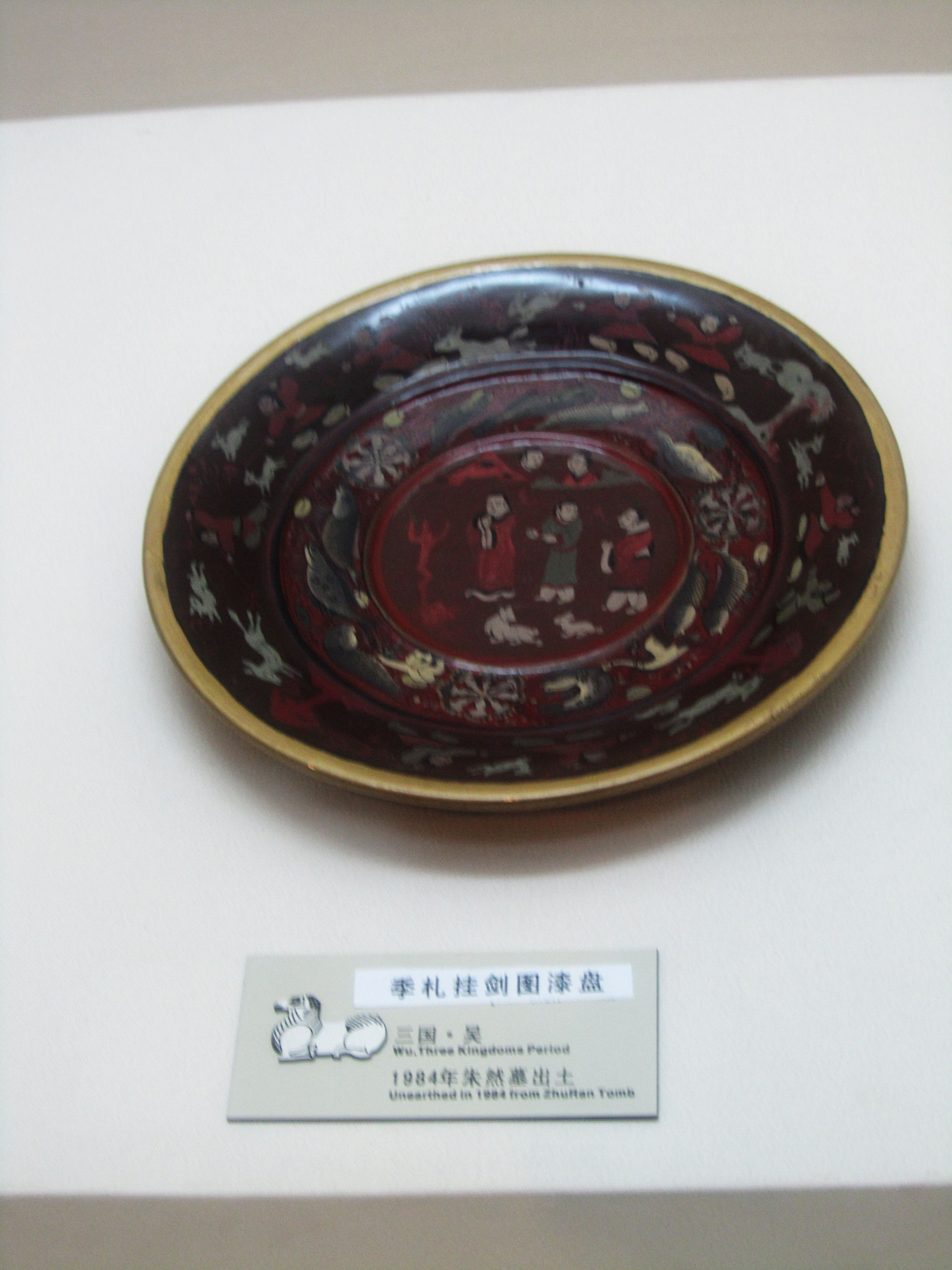
Painted lacquerware dish from the tomb of Zhu Ran (182–249 AD) in Anhui province, showing figures wearing Hanfu, Eastern Wu, Three Kingdoms period.

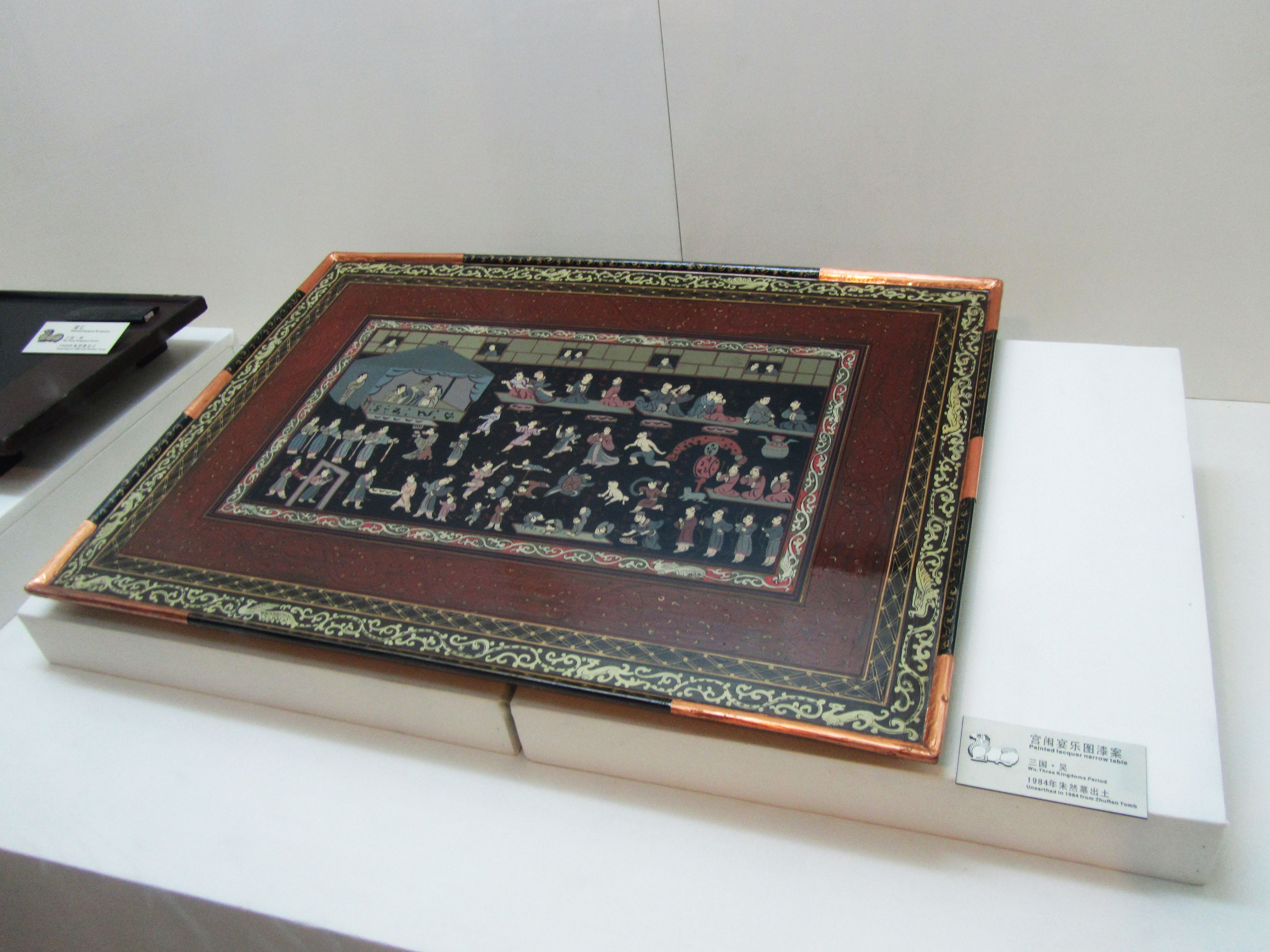
Painted lacquerware tray from the tomb of Zhu Ran, Three Kingdoms period.

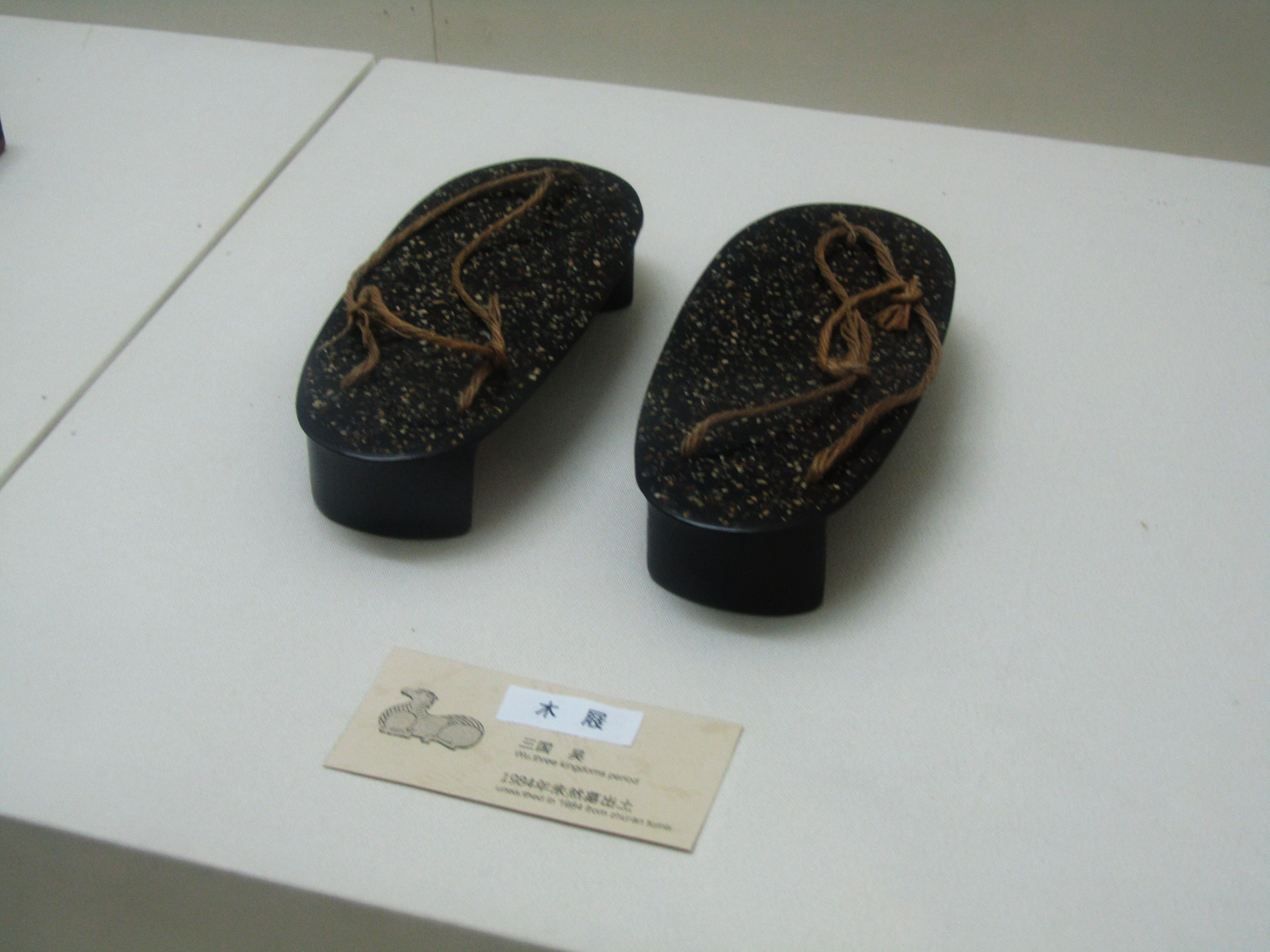
Black lacquered clogs from the tomb of Zhu Ran.

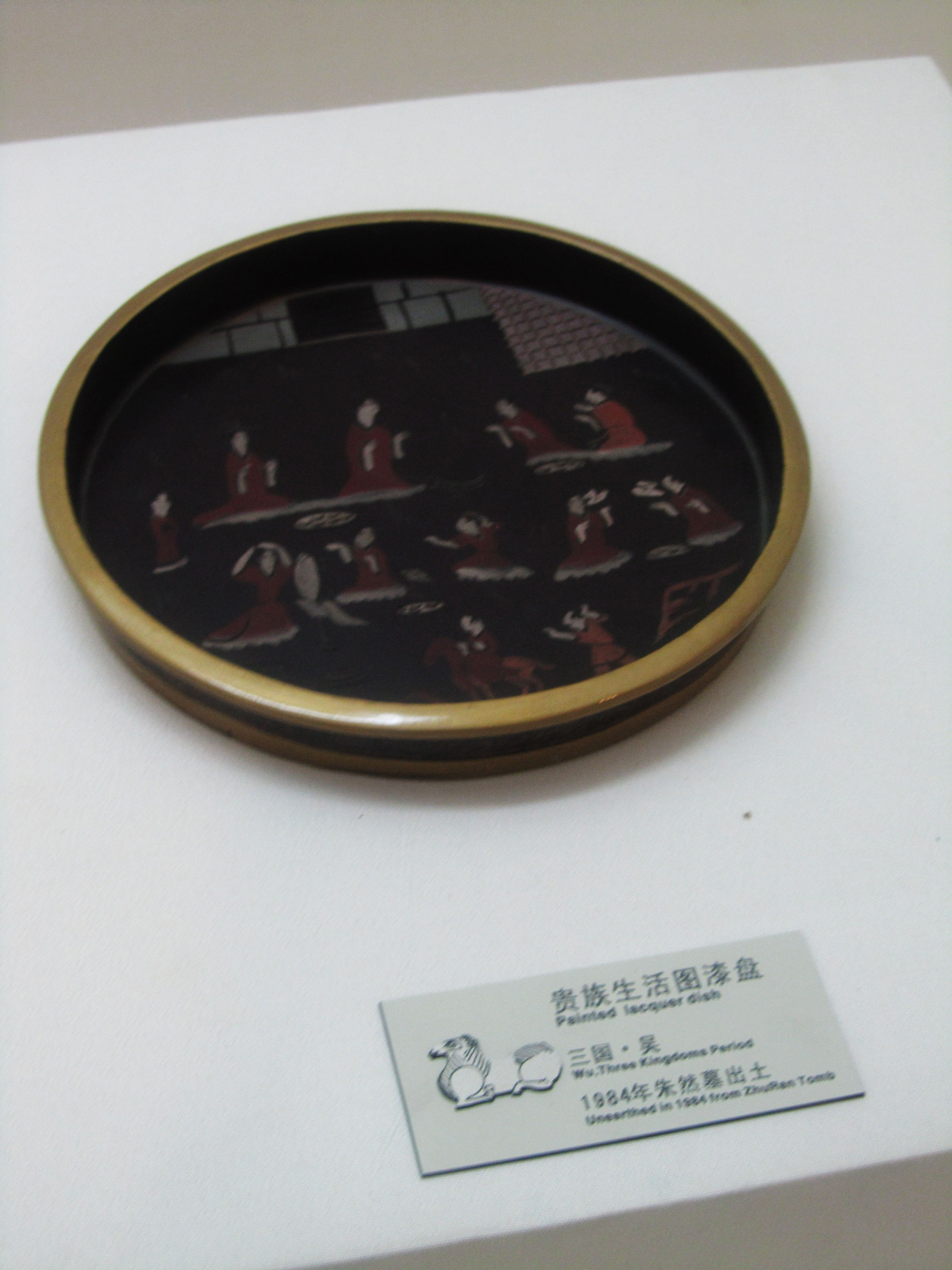
Painted lacquerware dish from the tomb of Zhu Ran, Three Kingdoms period.

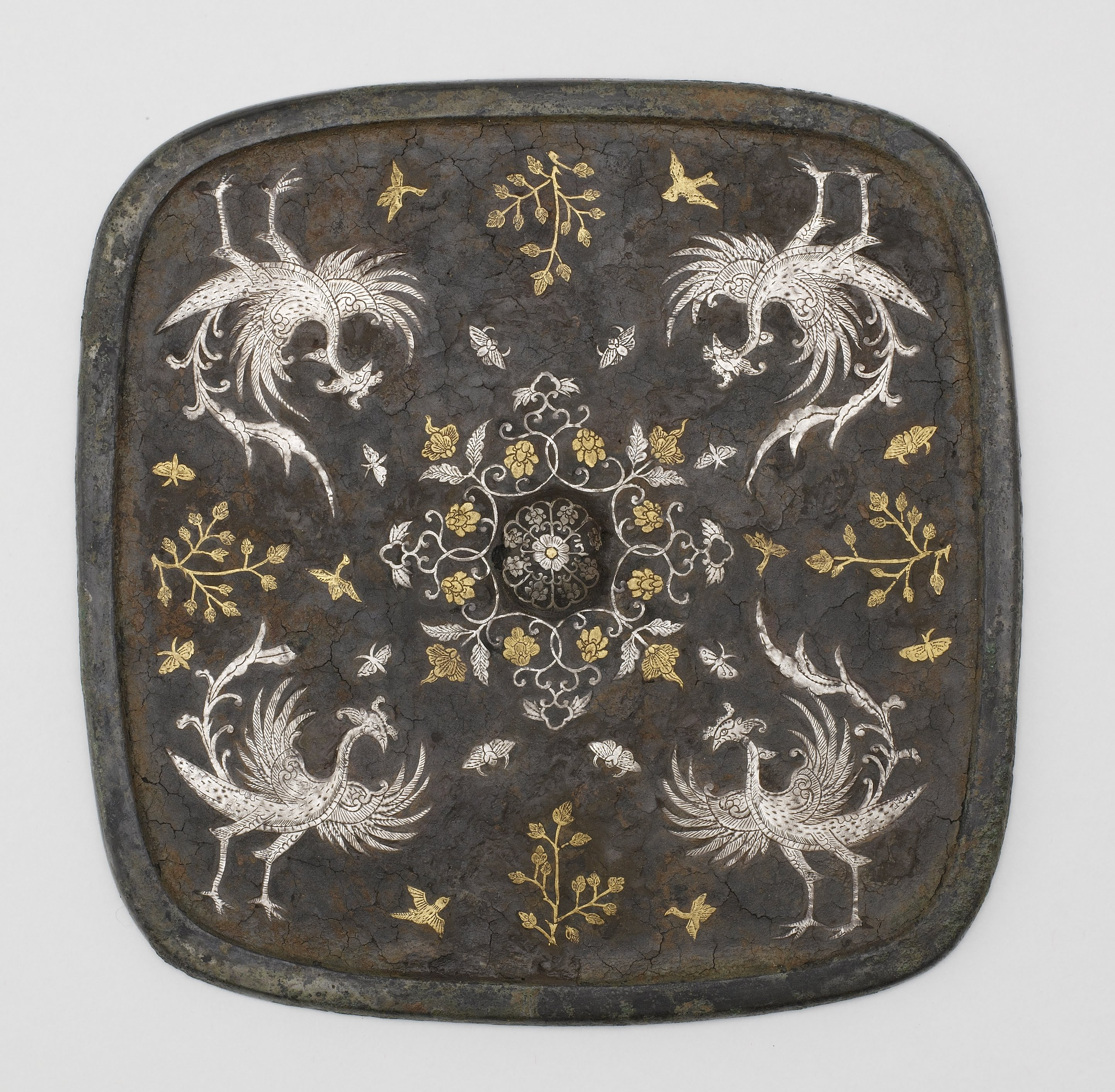
Lacquered mirror with bronze and silver inlays, Tang dynasty

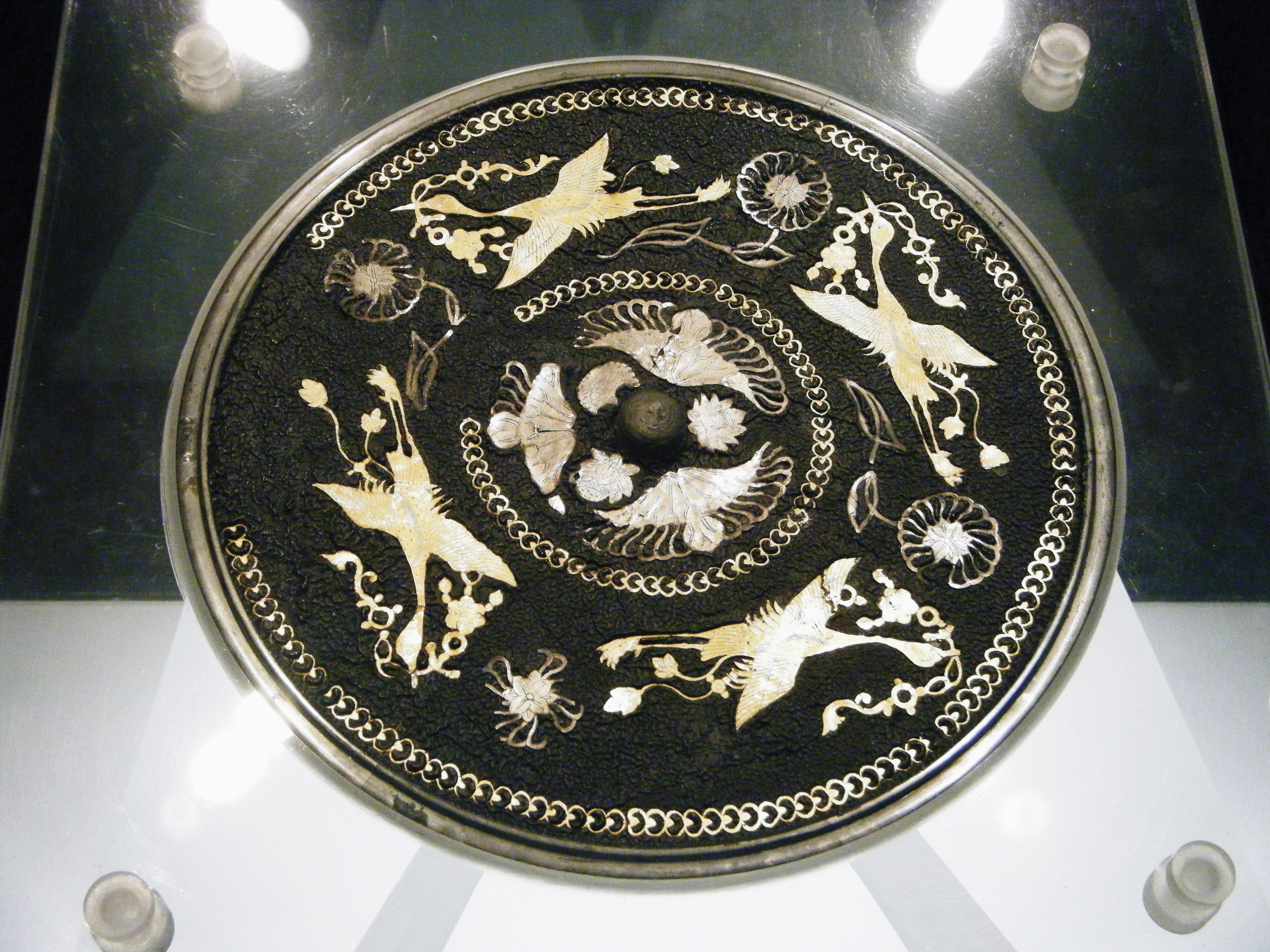
Black lacquered mirror back with four phoenixes, Tang dynasty

Lacquer mirror box with inlays for a Mirror, Tang - Song dynasty

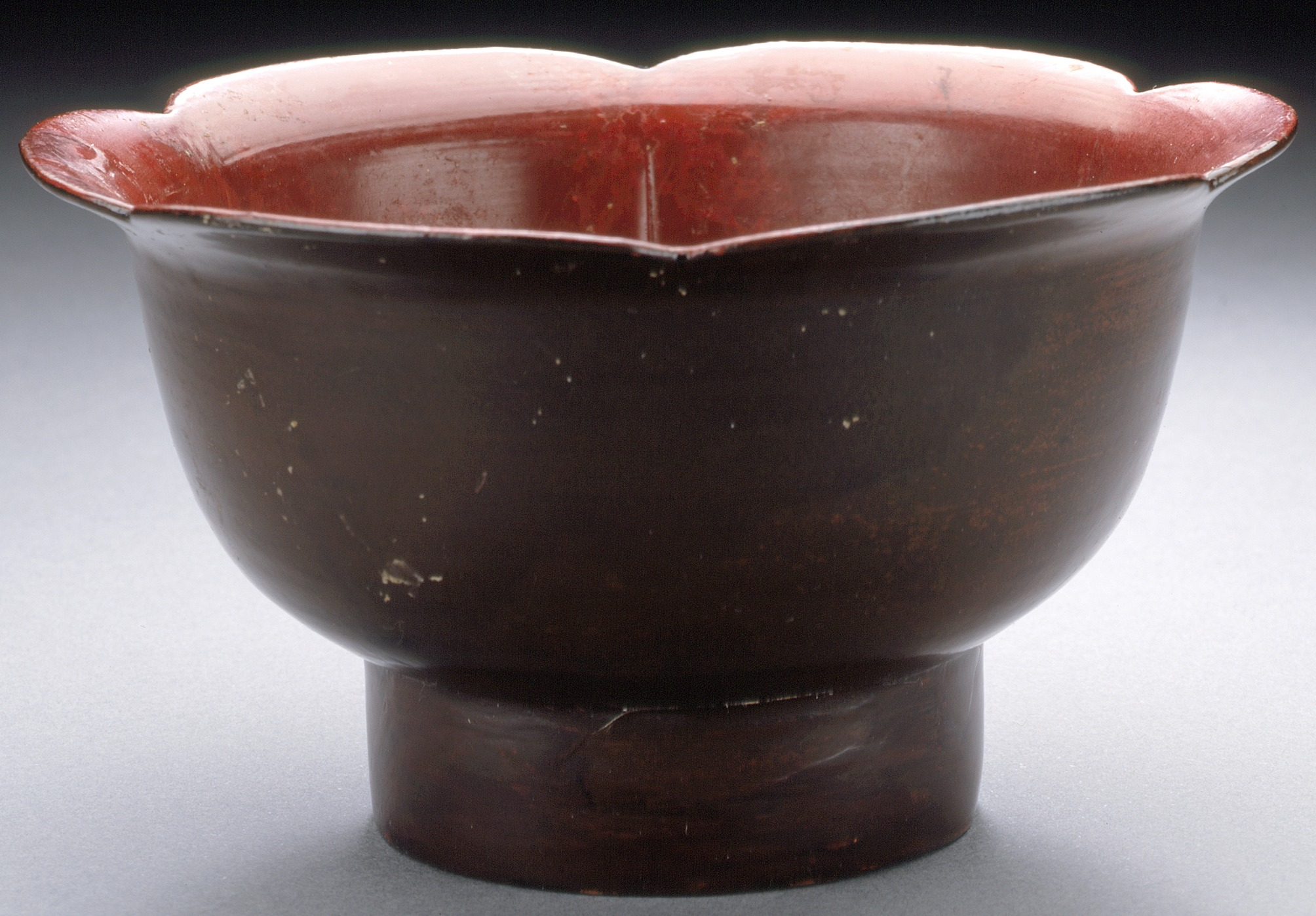
Bowl in shape of a flower blossom, Song dynasty

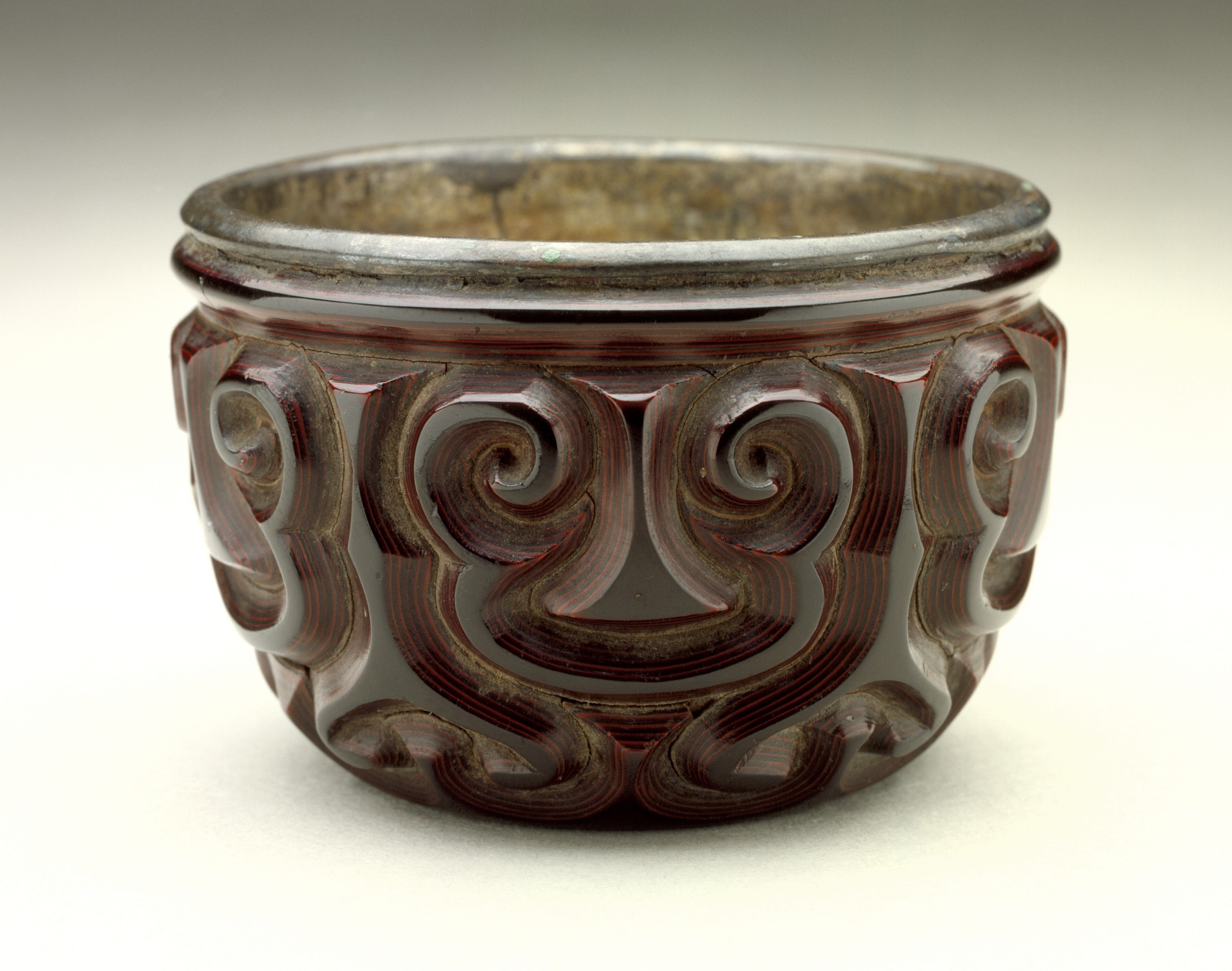
Cup with Sword-Pommel Pattern, Song dynasty

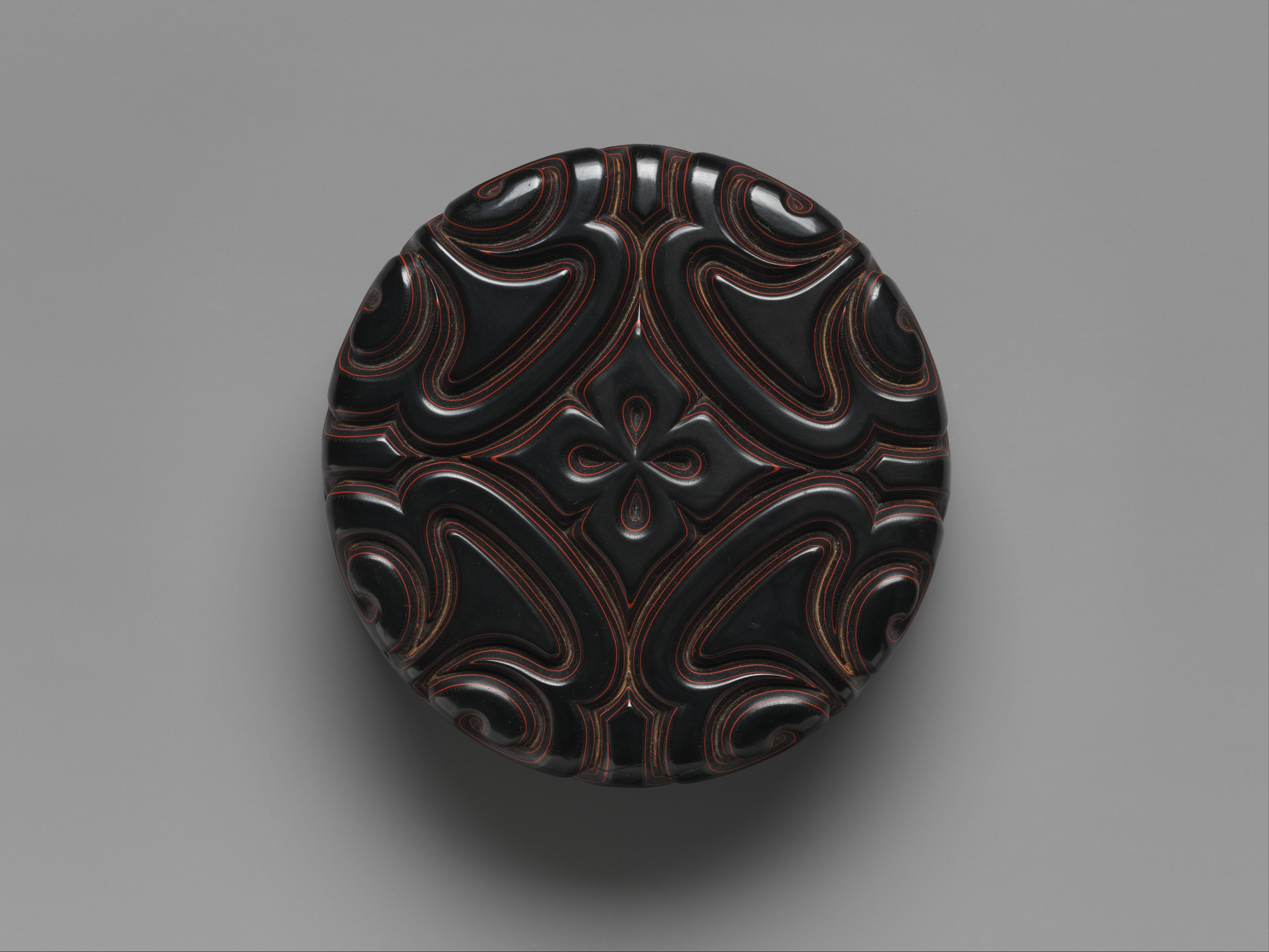
Box with Pommel Scroll design, Song dynasty

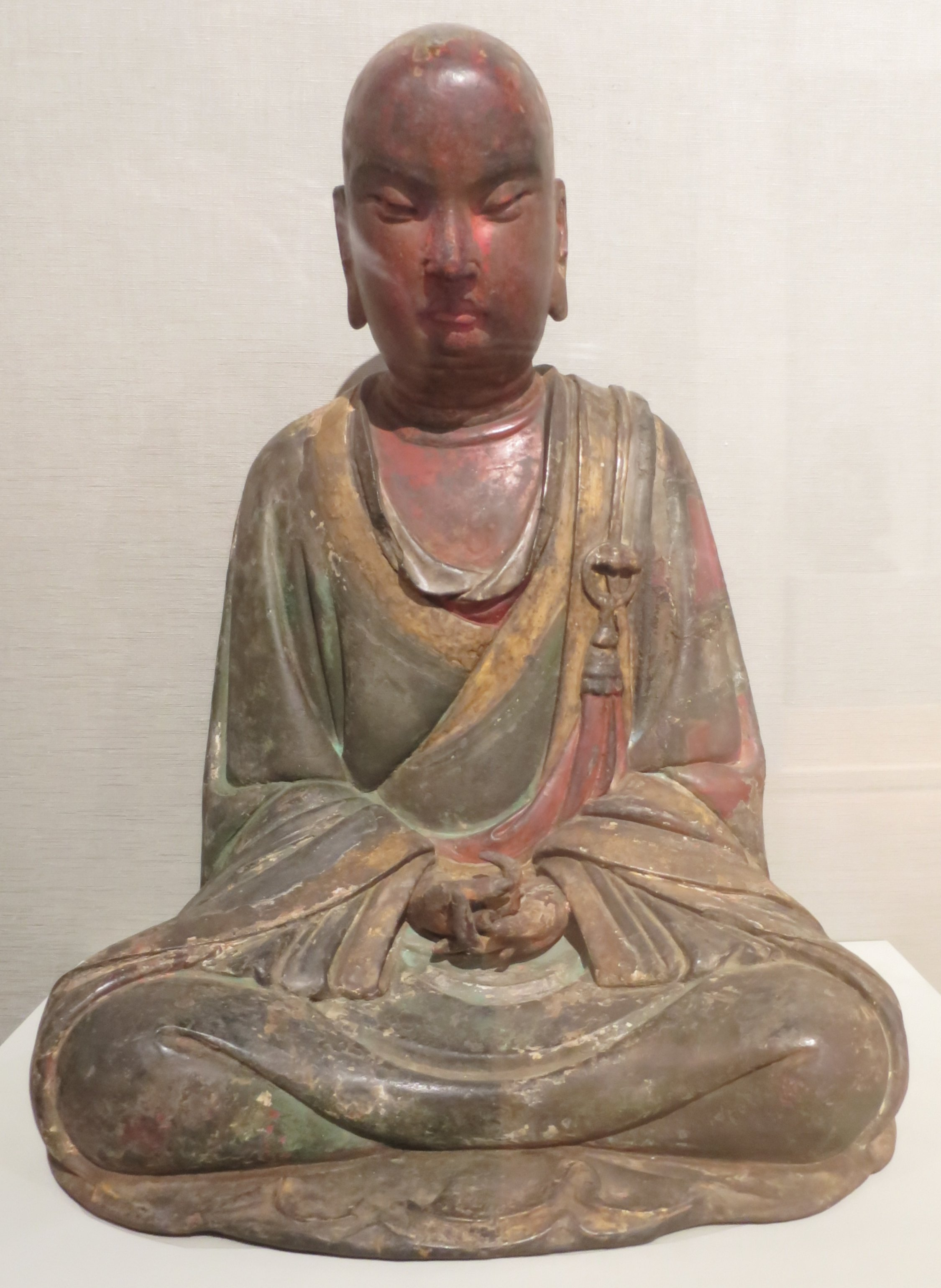
Lacquered Buddhist abbot, Song dynasty

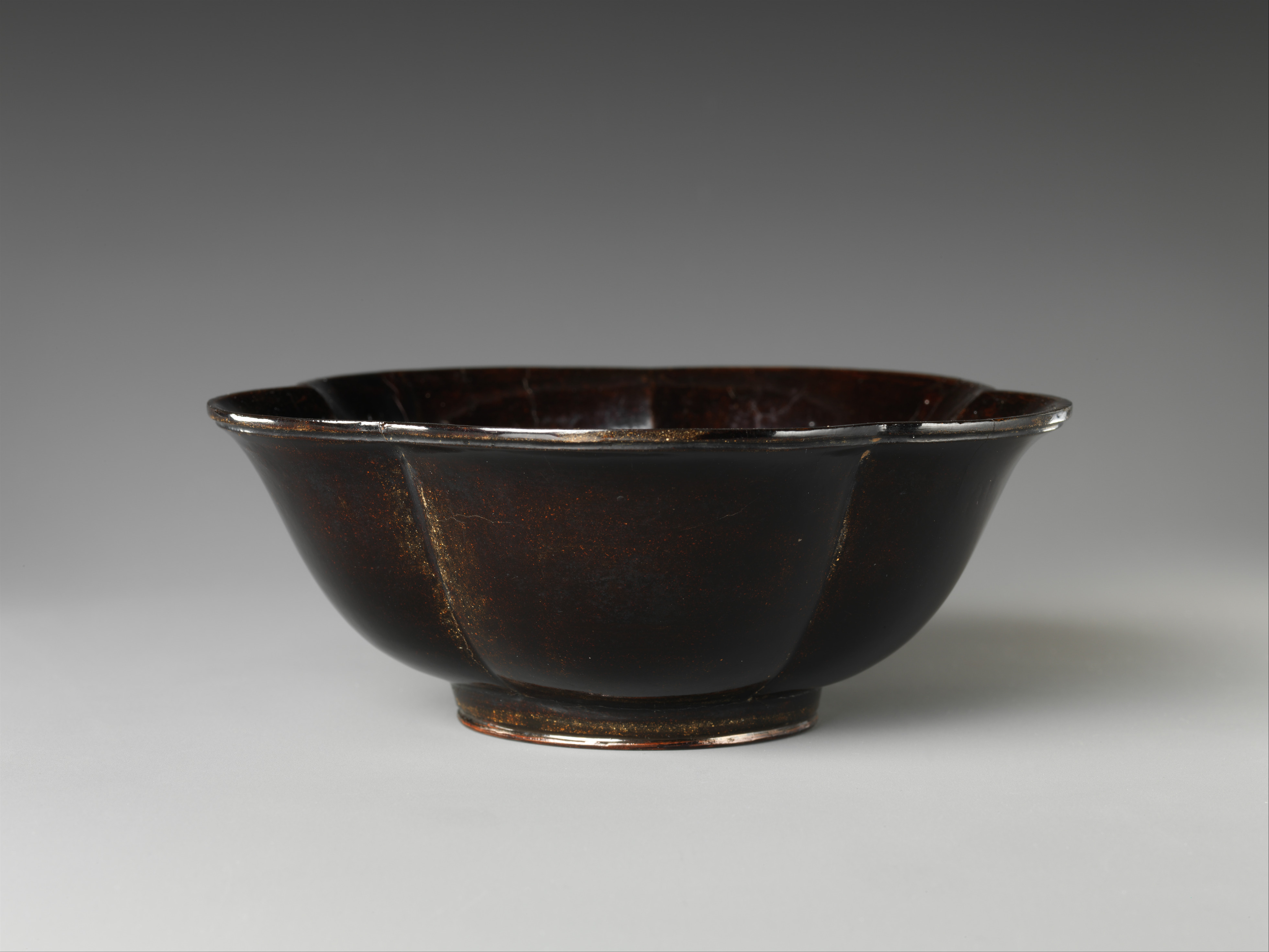
Black lacquered plum-blossom-shaped cup, Song dynasty

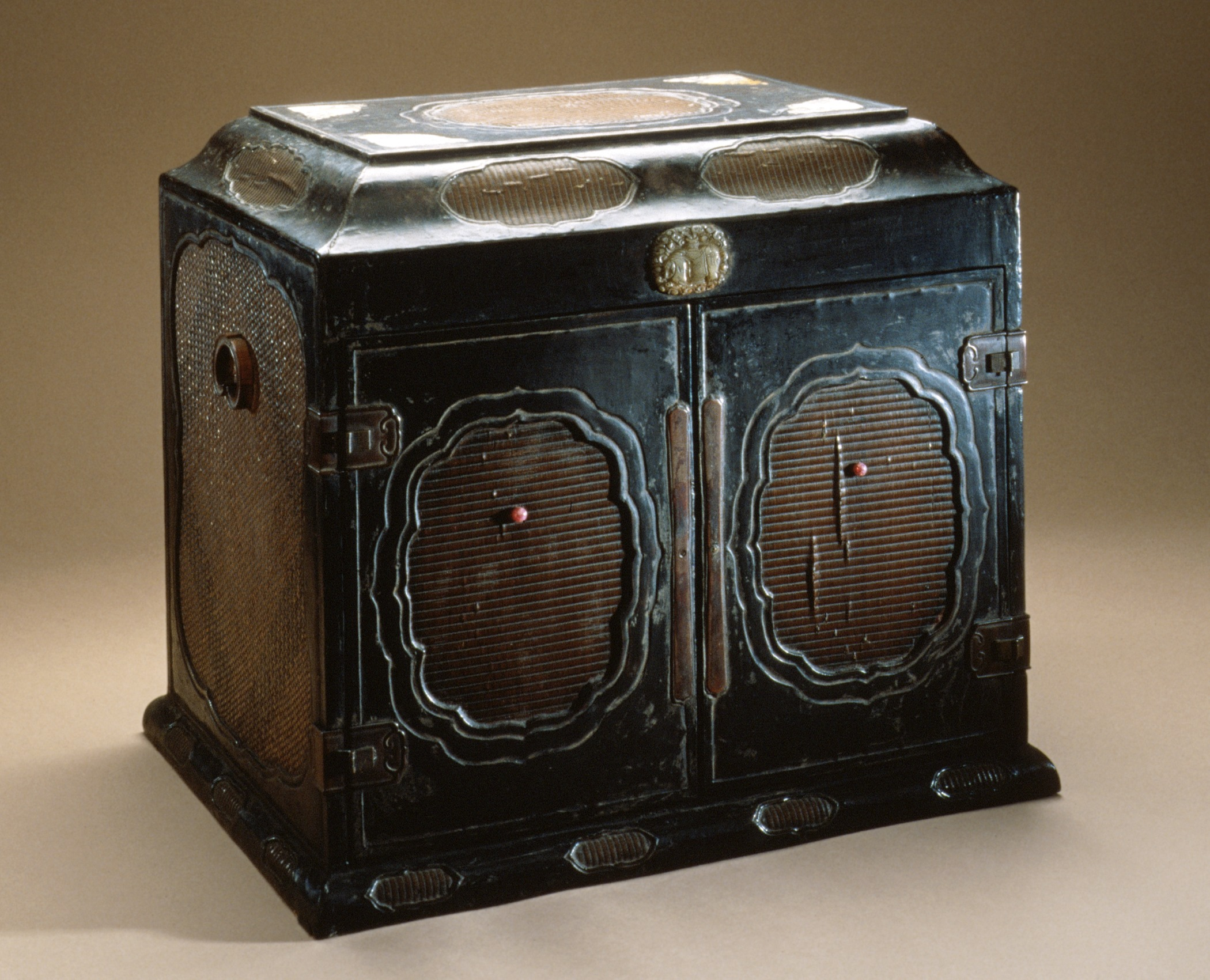
Black lacquer on wood core with wickerwork panels, Song dynasty

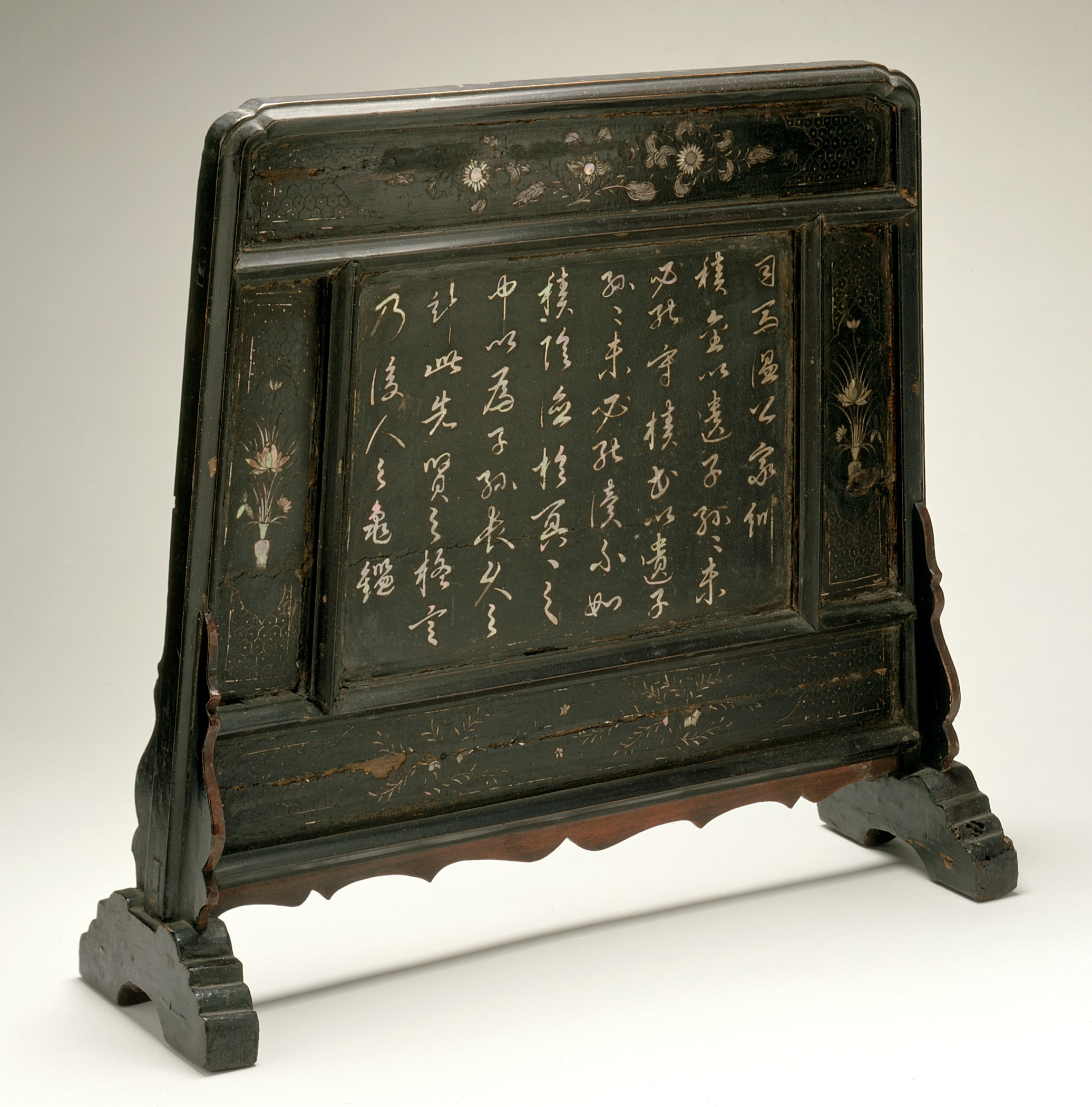
Tablescreen with Calligraphy of Sima Guang's Family Instructions, Song dynasty

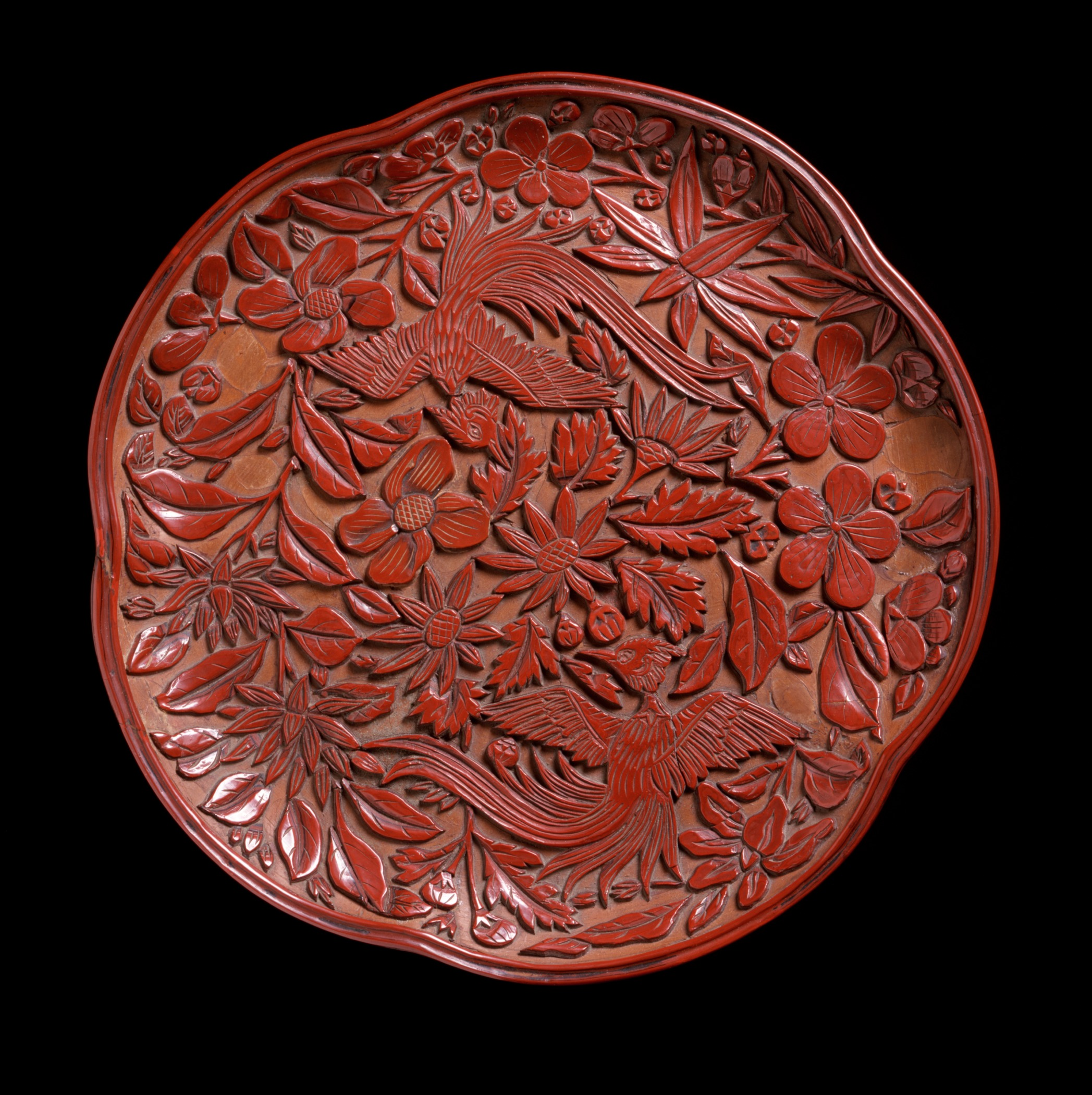
Pan in the Form of a Plum Blossom with Birds and Flowers, Late Song dynasty

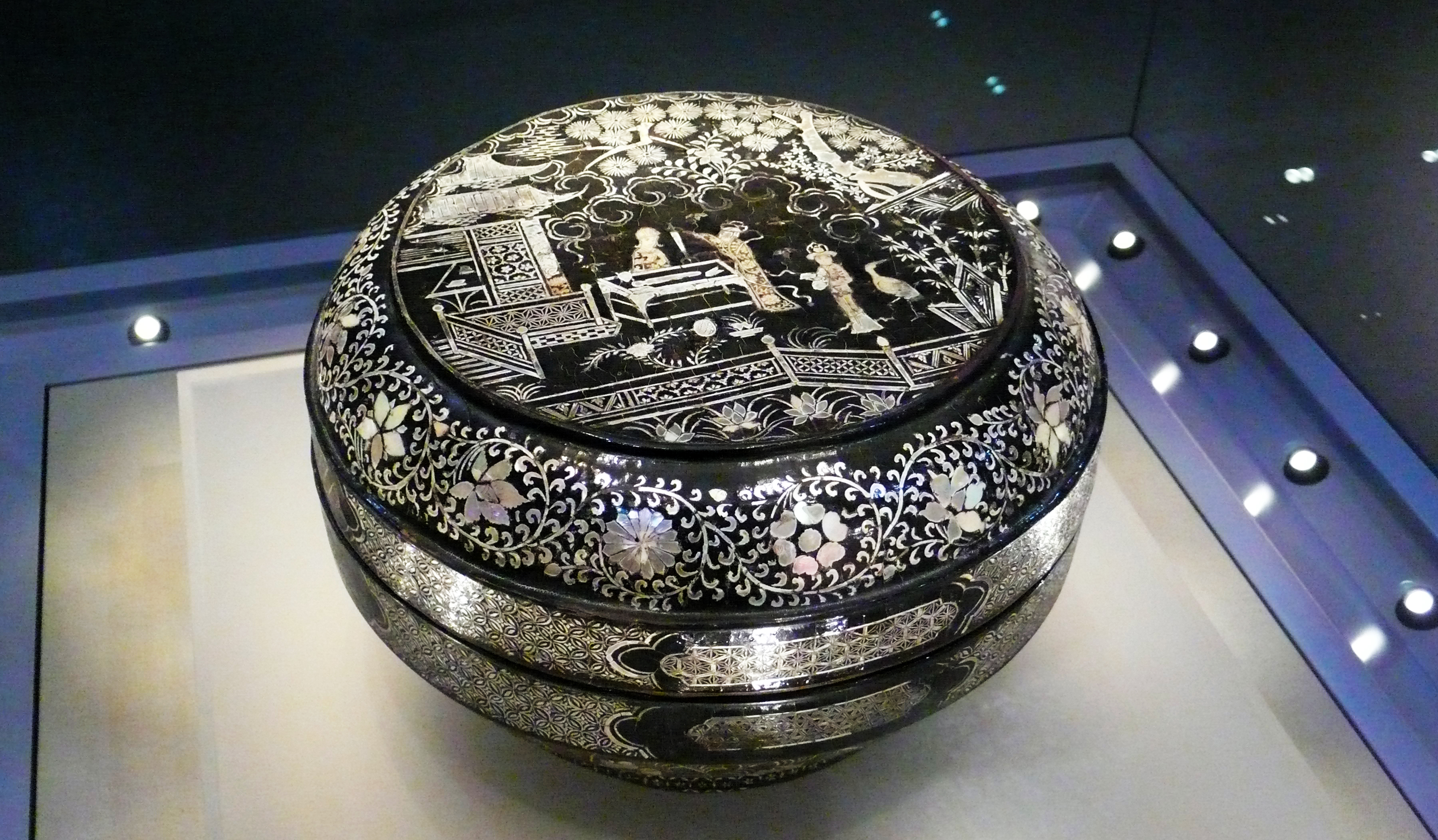
Black lacquered box with painted figures, Late Song dynasty

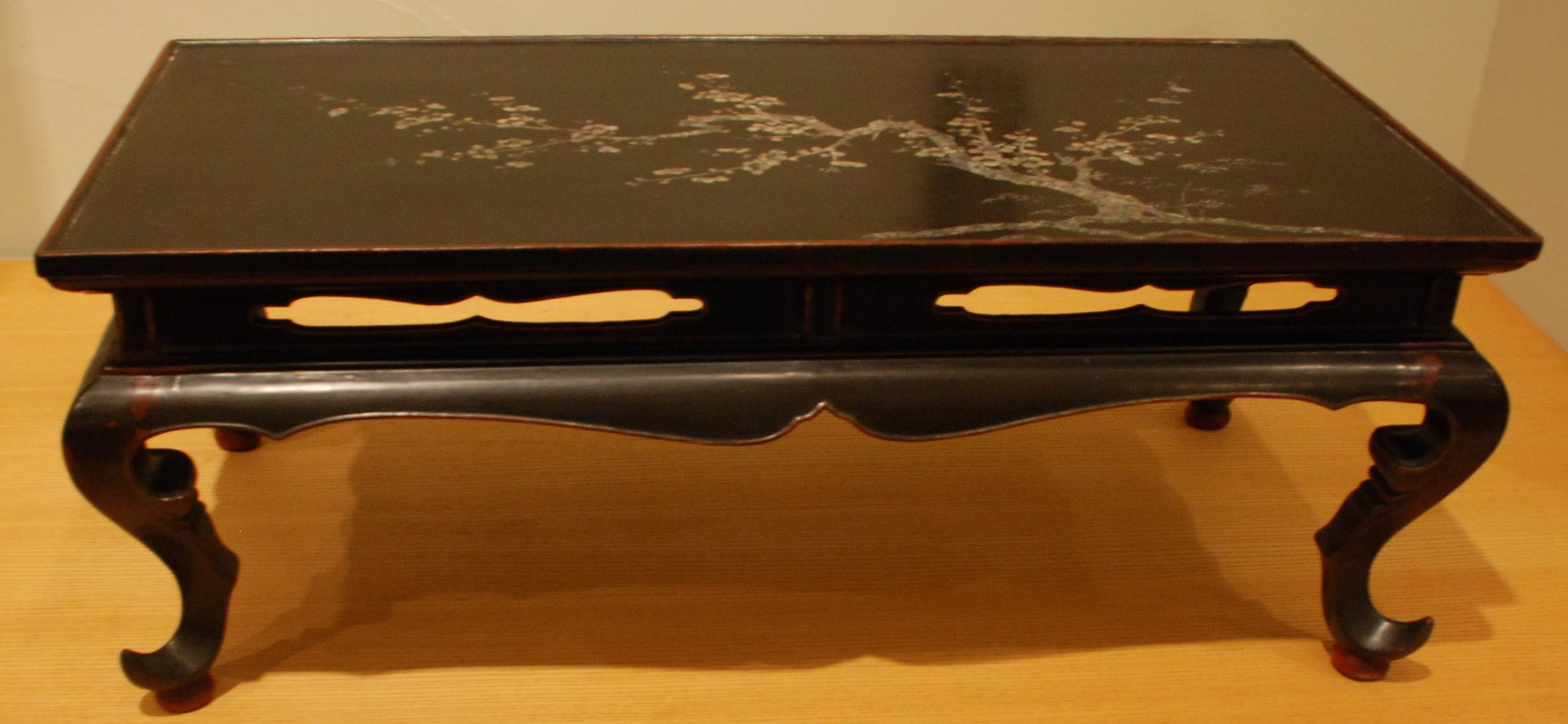
A lacquered table of the Yuan dynasty, 14th century, with an inlaid mother-of-pearl decoration of a tree

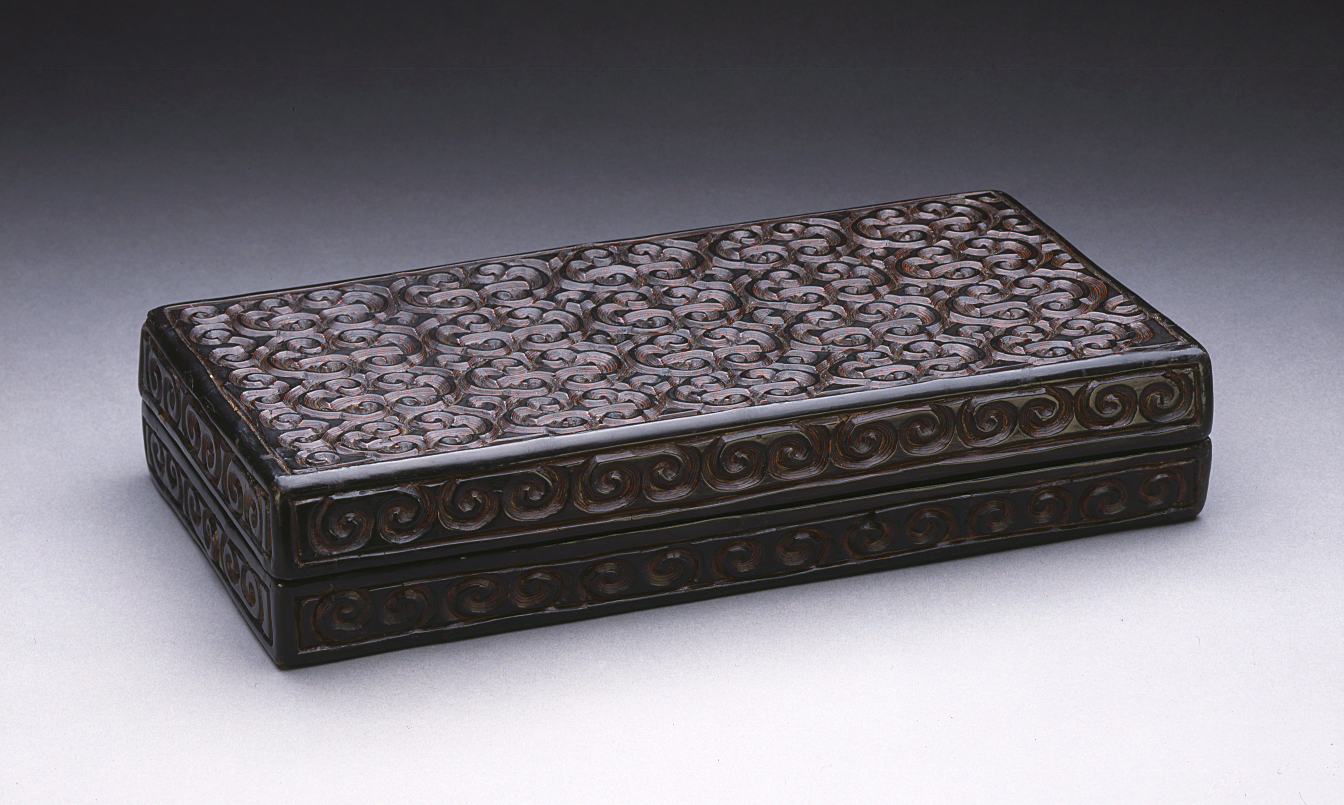
Carved lacquer box with the "Sword-Pommel Pattern", Yuan dynasty (1279–1368)

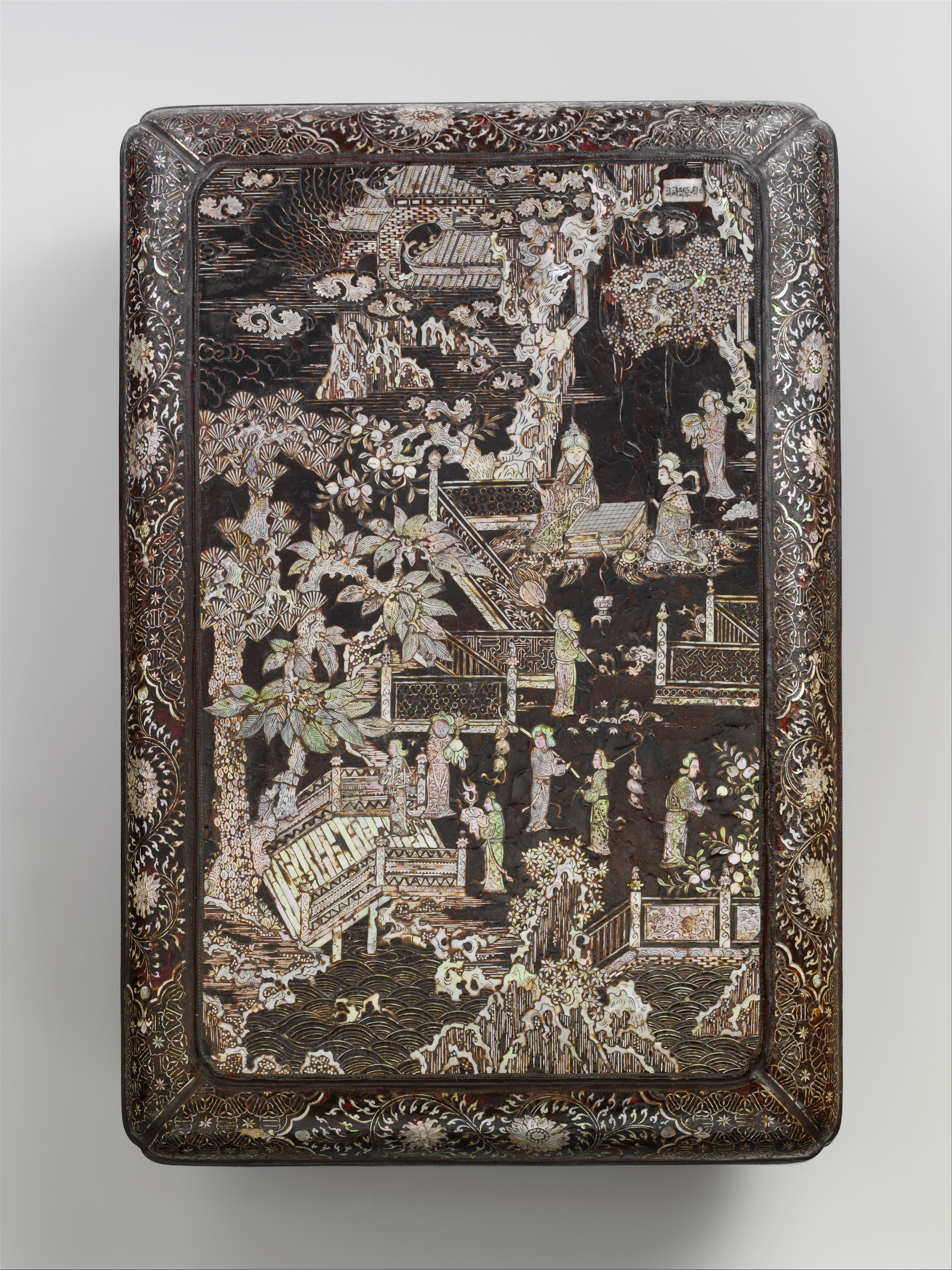
Black lacquer box with pearl inlays, late Yuan to early Ming dynasty.

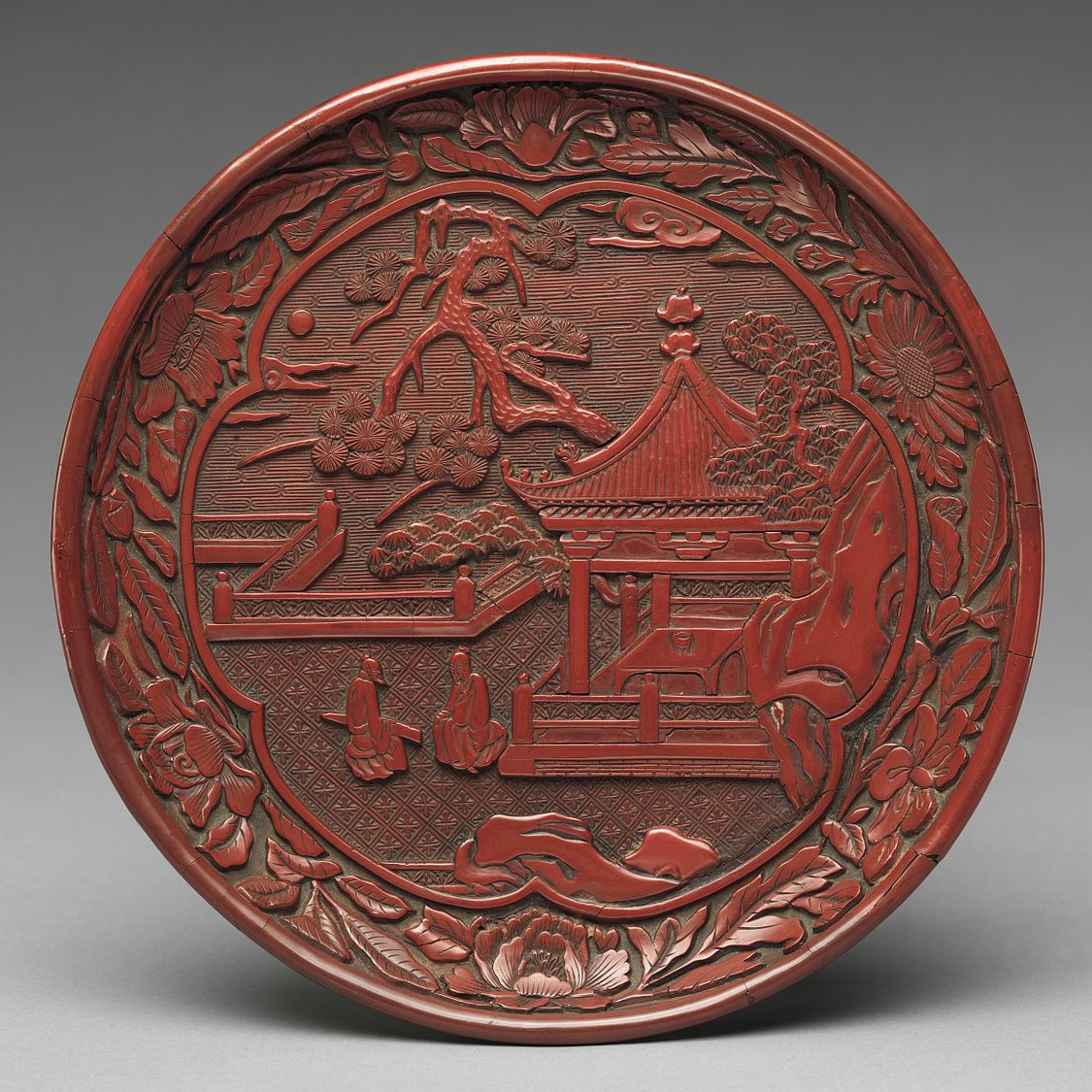
Lacquer Dish with garden scene, Early Ming dynasty

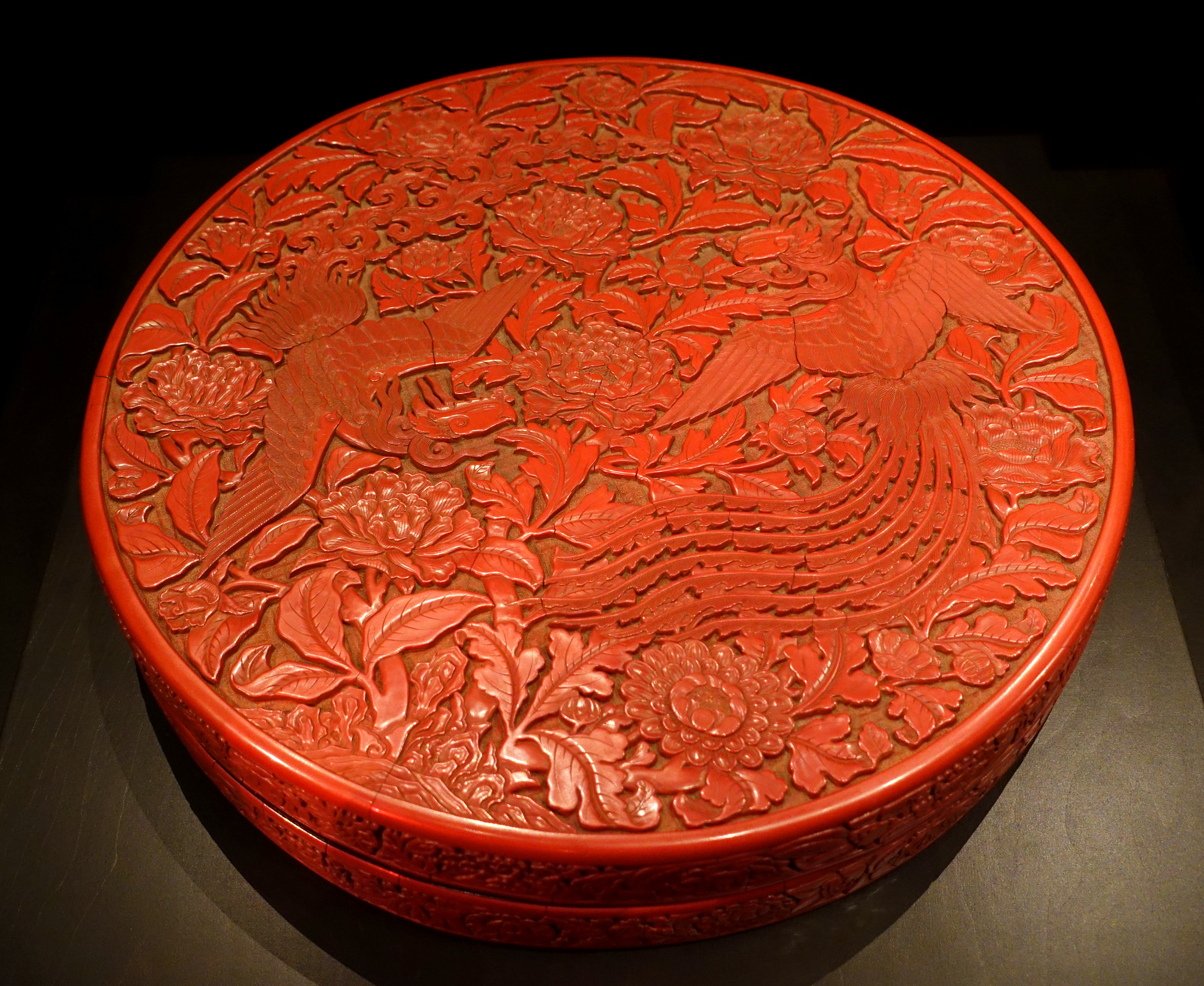
Box, Ming dynasty, Yongle era (1403–1424)

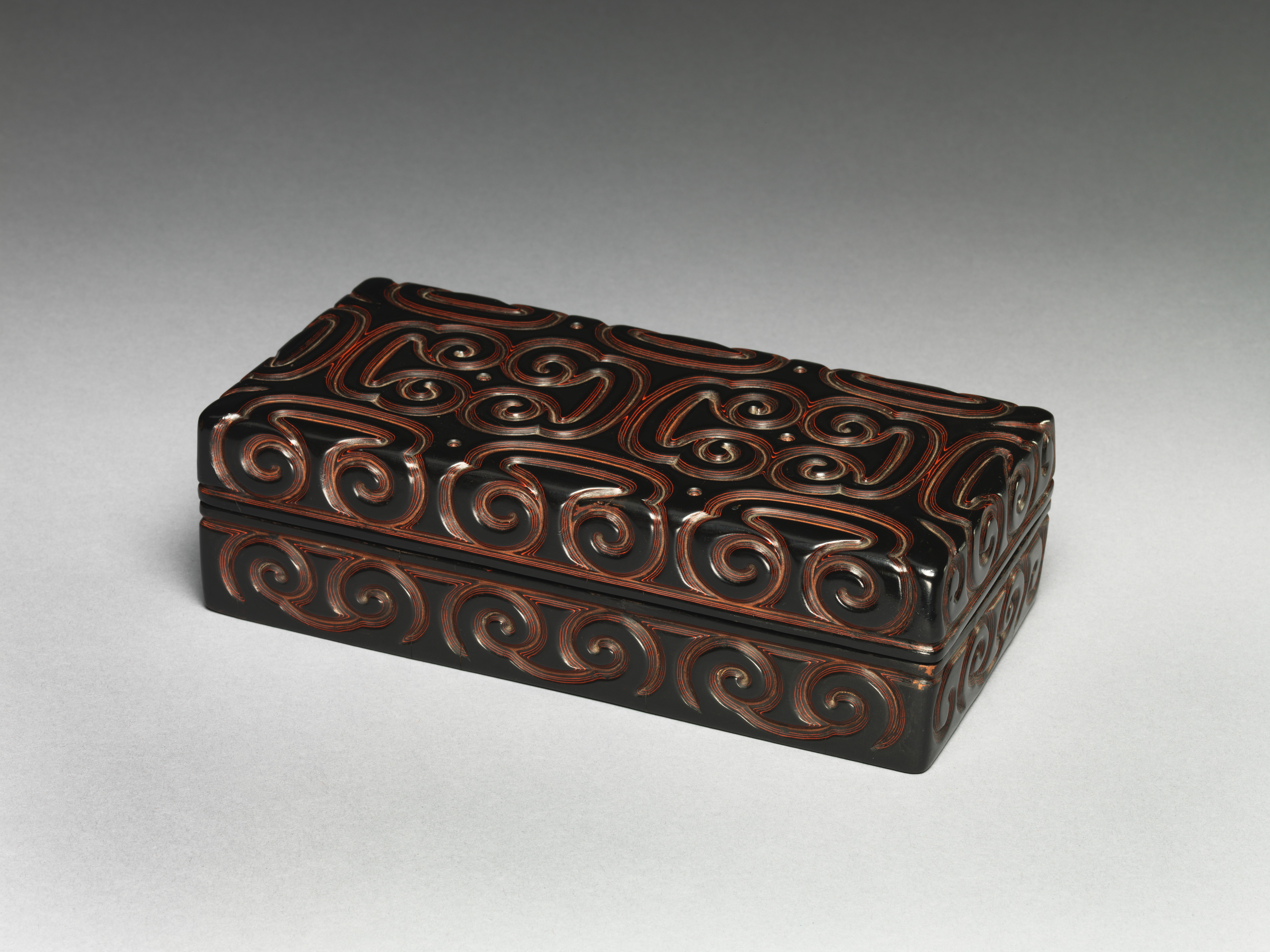
Lacquer Box with pommel scroll design, Ming dynasty

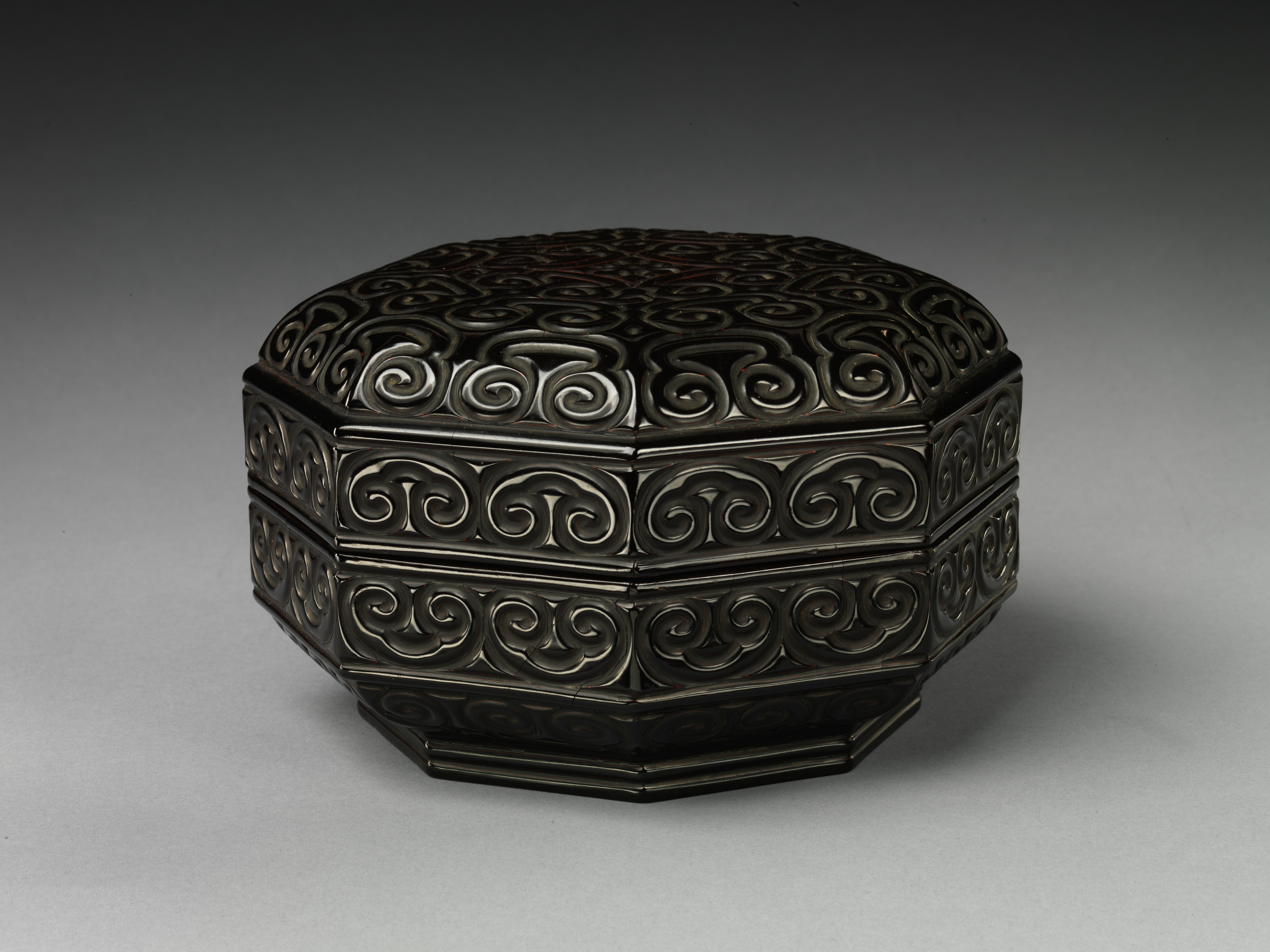
Octagonal food box with pommel scrolls, Ming dynasty

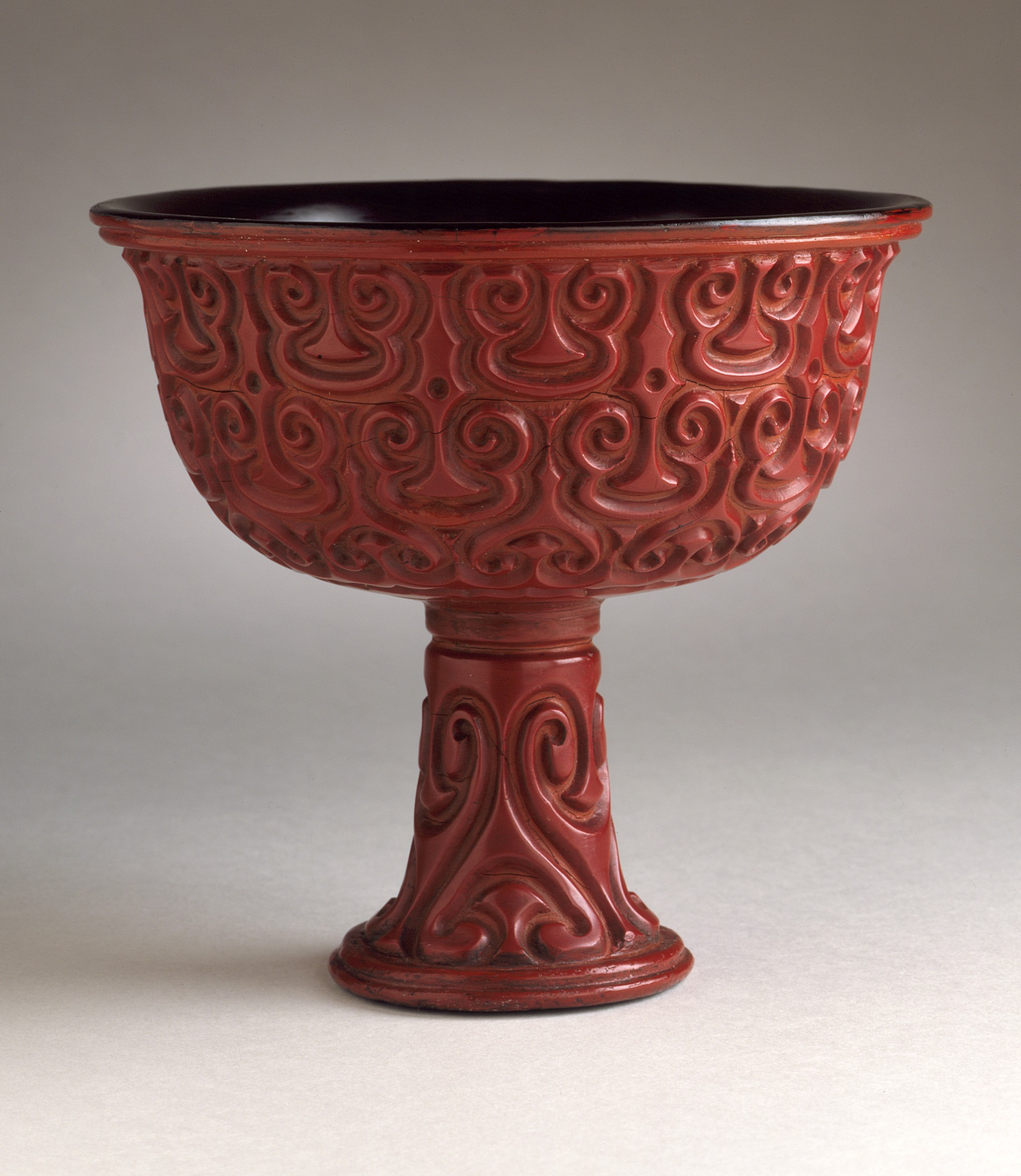
Carved lacquer stem cup with the "Sword-Pommel Pattern", mid-Ming dynasty

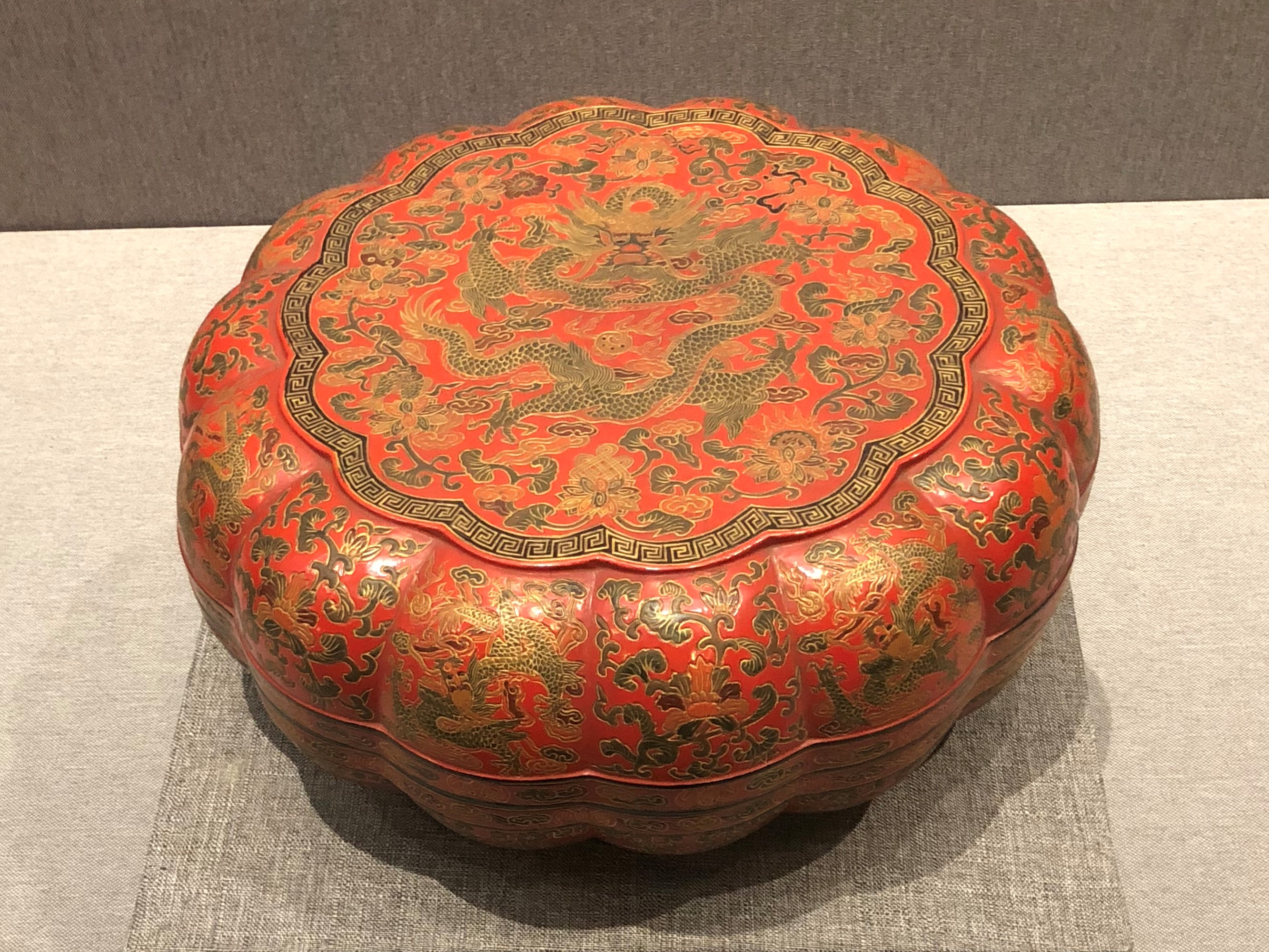
Lacquer box with dragon motifs and inlays, Ming dynasty

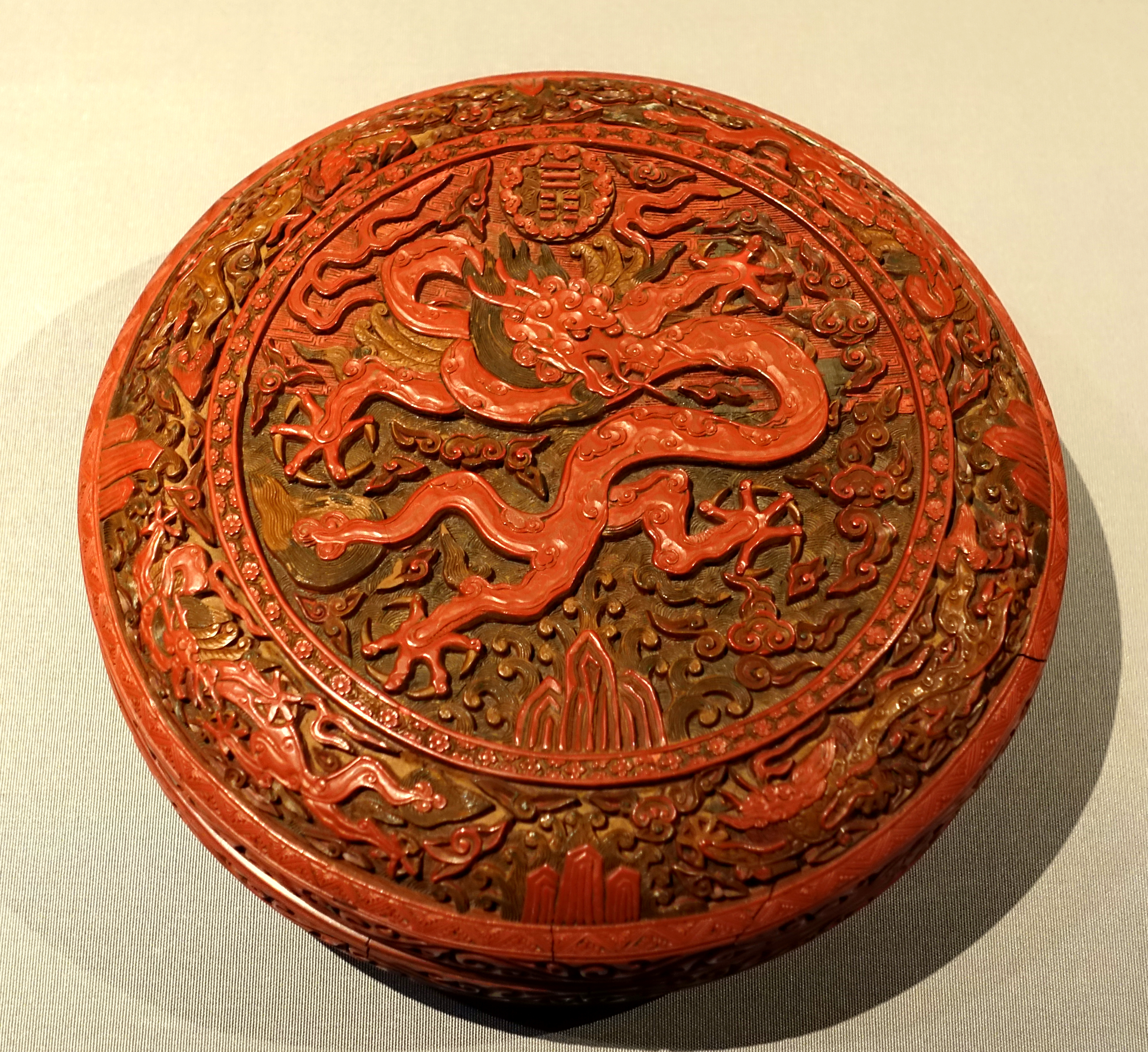
Covered box with dragon motif, Ming dynasty, Jiajing era, 1522-1566 AD

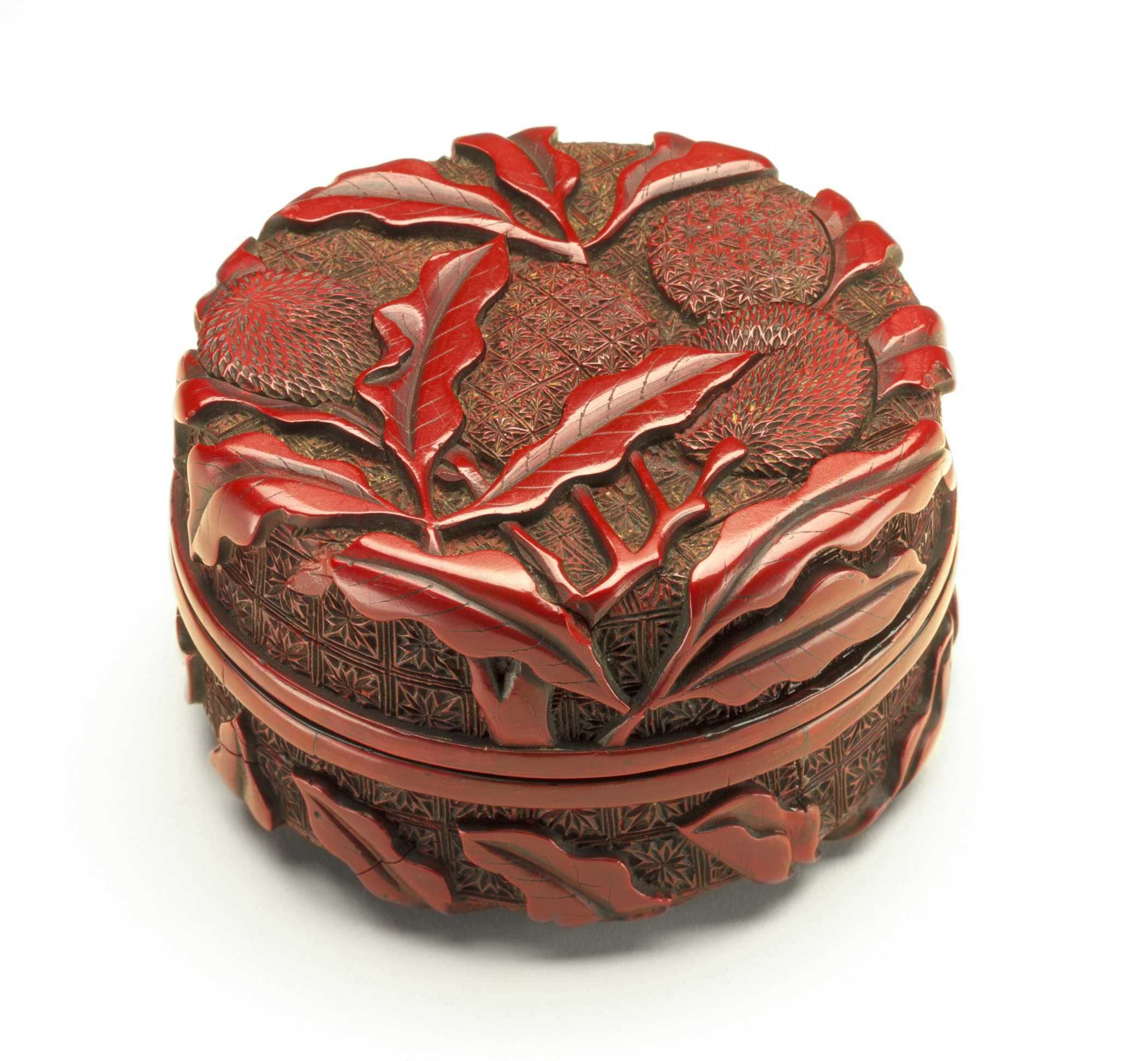
Carved red lacquer on wood core, Ming dynasty

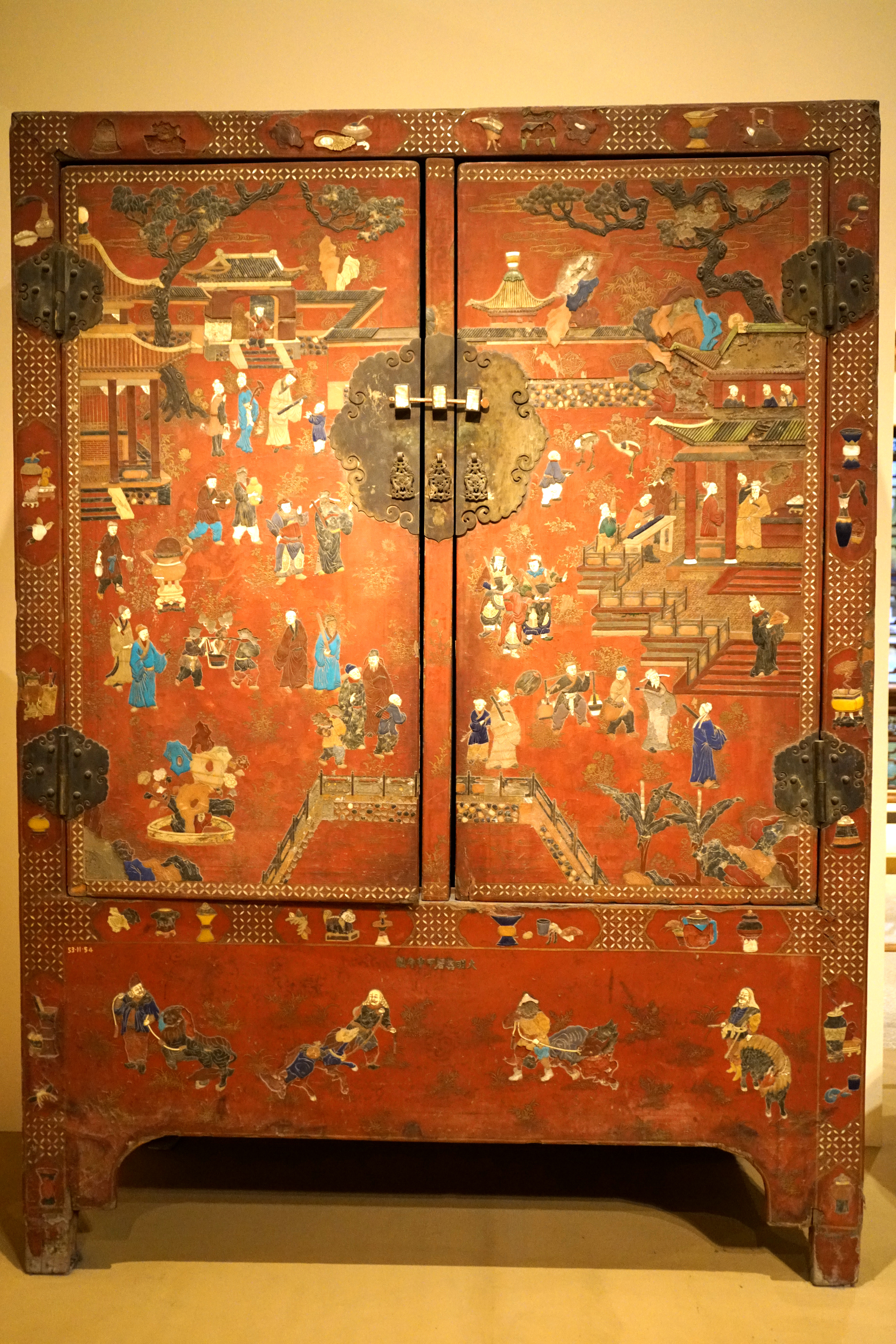
Red Lacquer Wardrobes Inlaid with Various Treasures, Ming dynasty

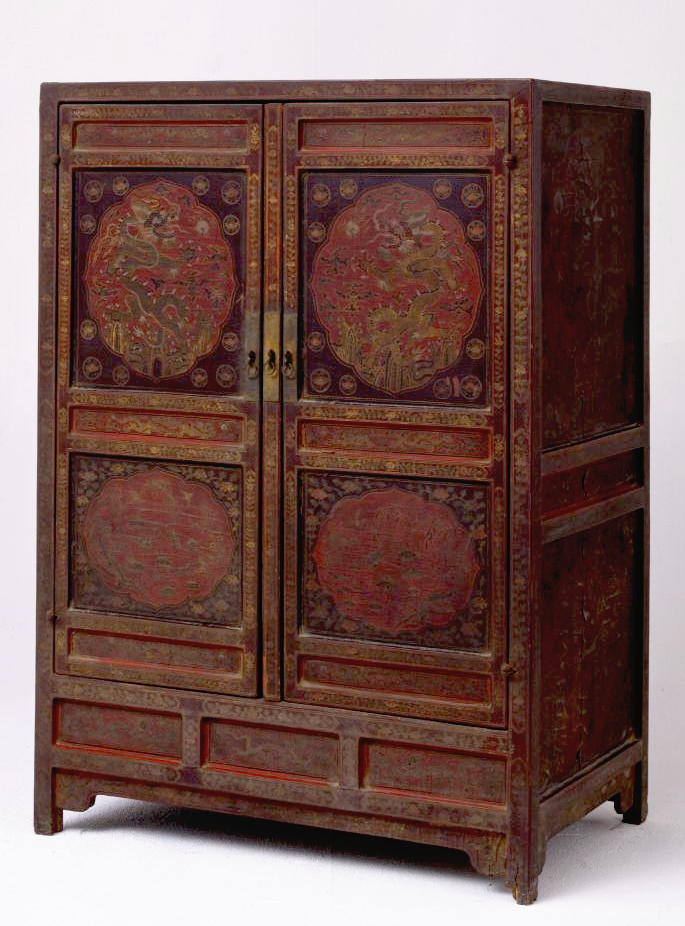
Lacquer cabinet with dragon and cloud motifs, from Wanli era, Ming dynasty

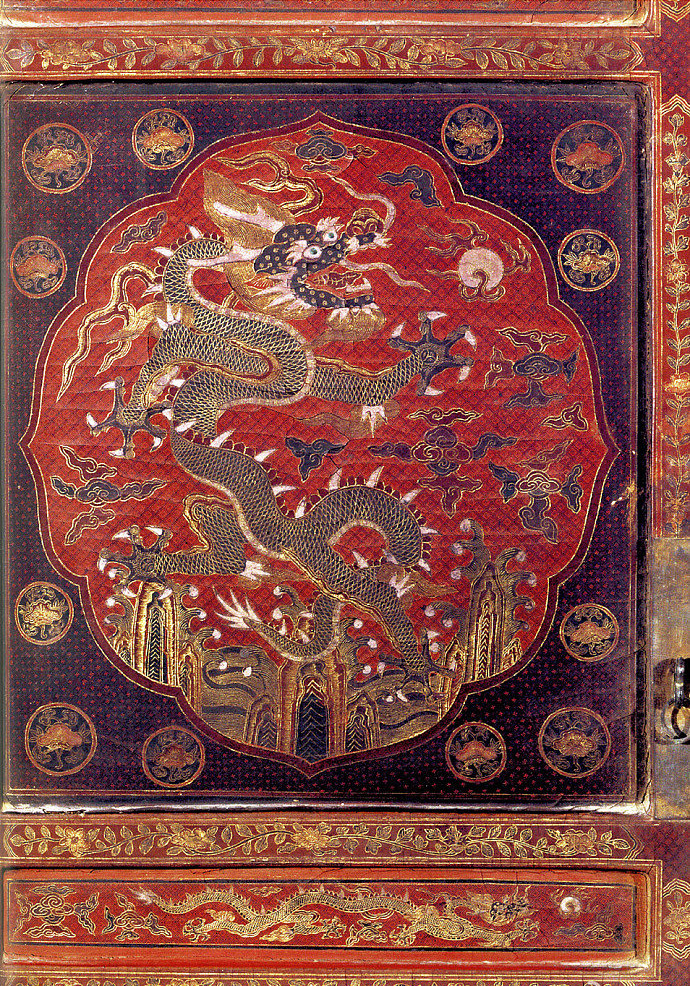
Detail of lacquer cabinet with dragon and cloud motifs, Ming dynasty

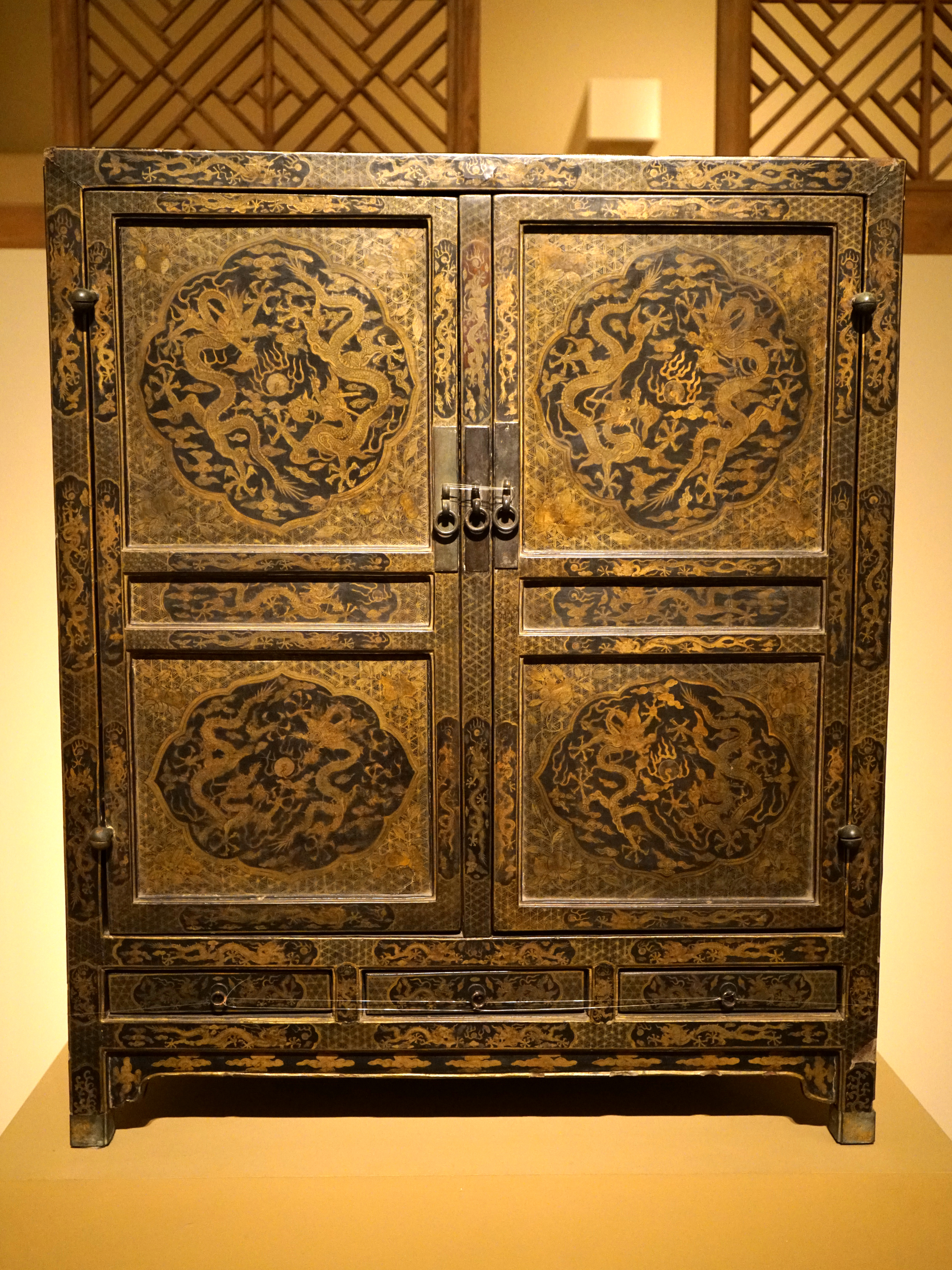
Black lacquered medicine cabinet with dragon patterns from Wanli era, Ming dynasty.

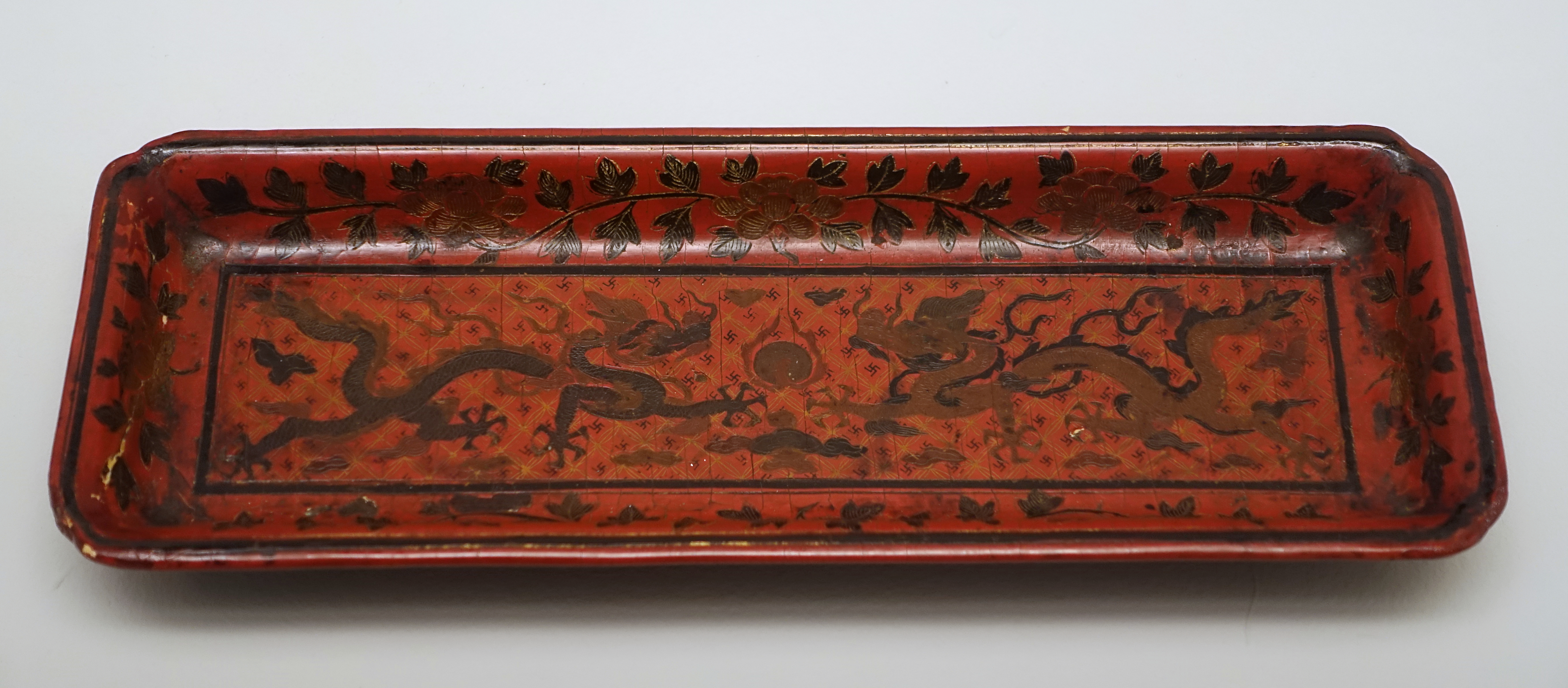
Tray with dragons, Ming dynasty.

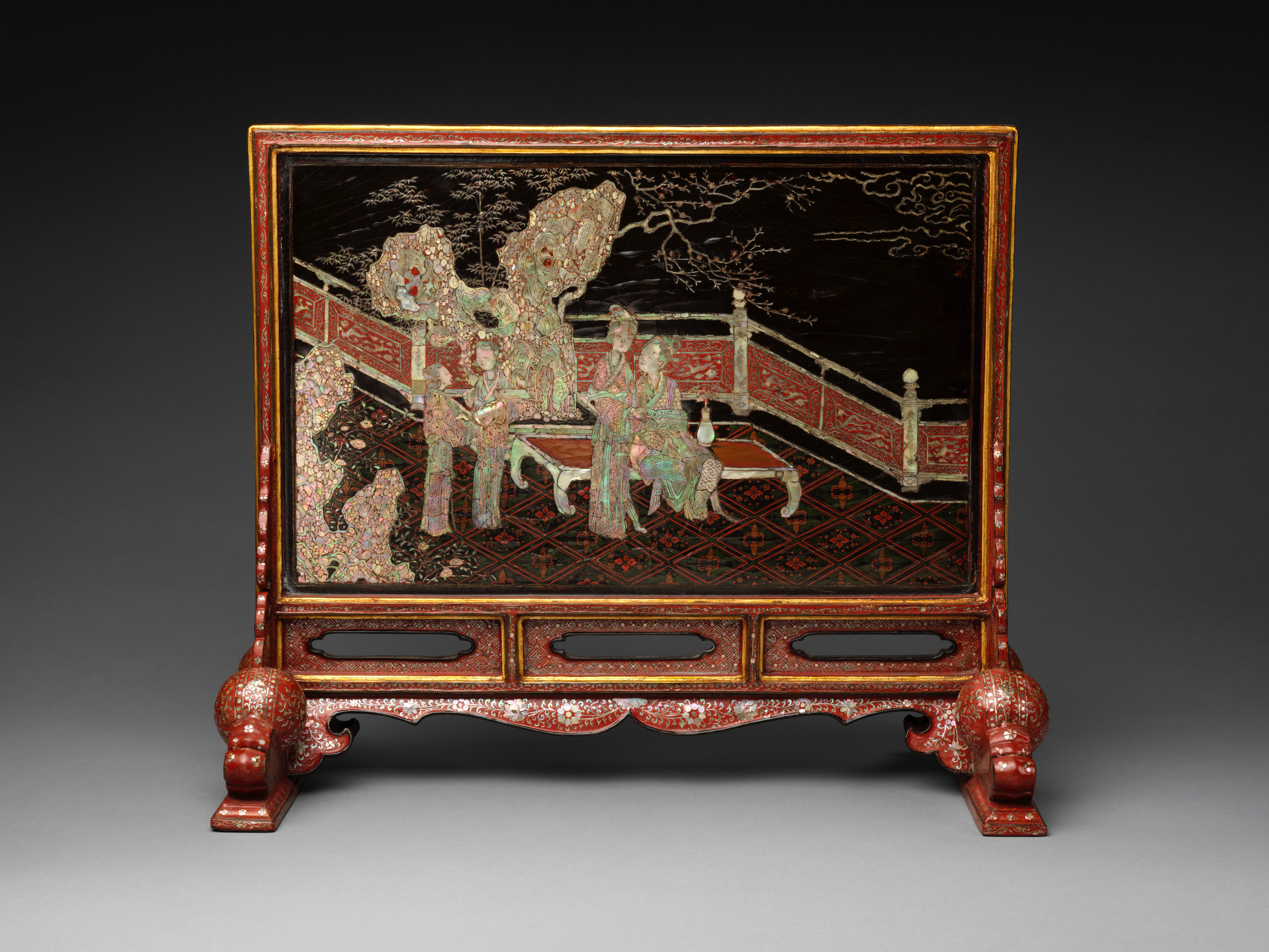
Lacquer table-screen

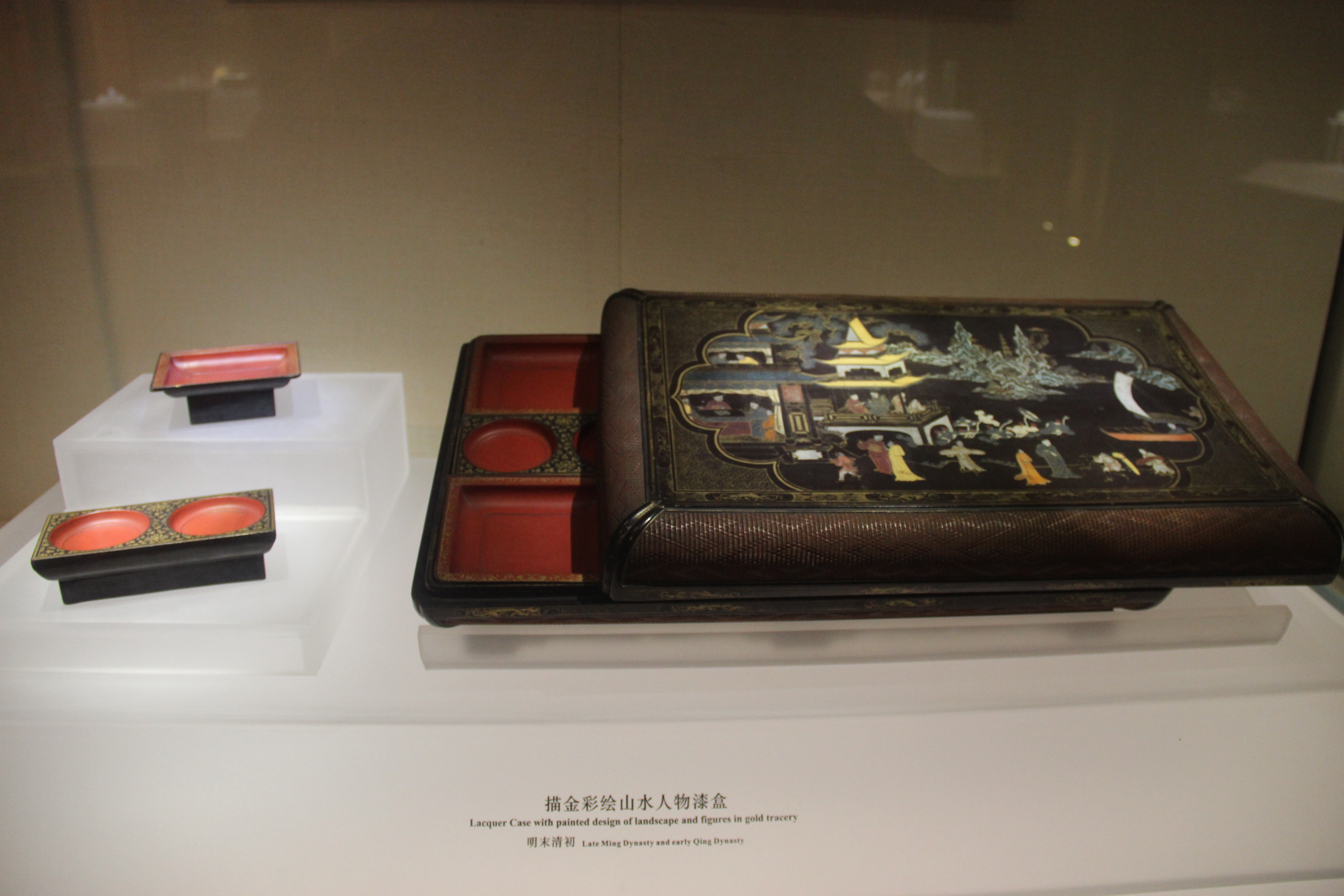
Late Ming - Early Qing dynasty lacquered Case

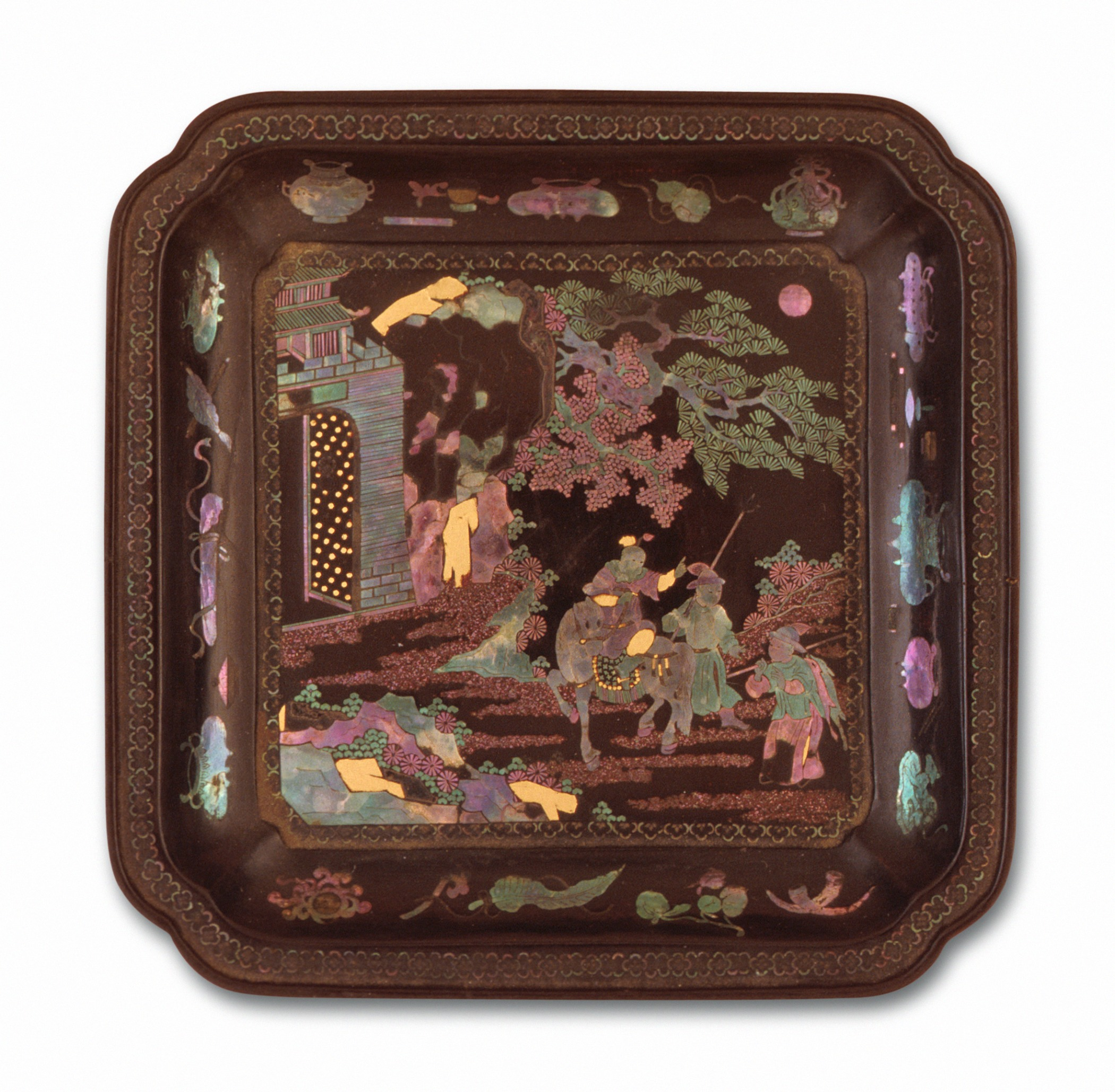
Square dish, Qing dynasty, Kangxi era (1662–1722)

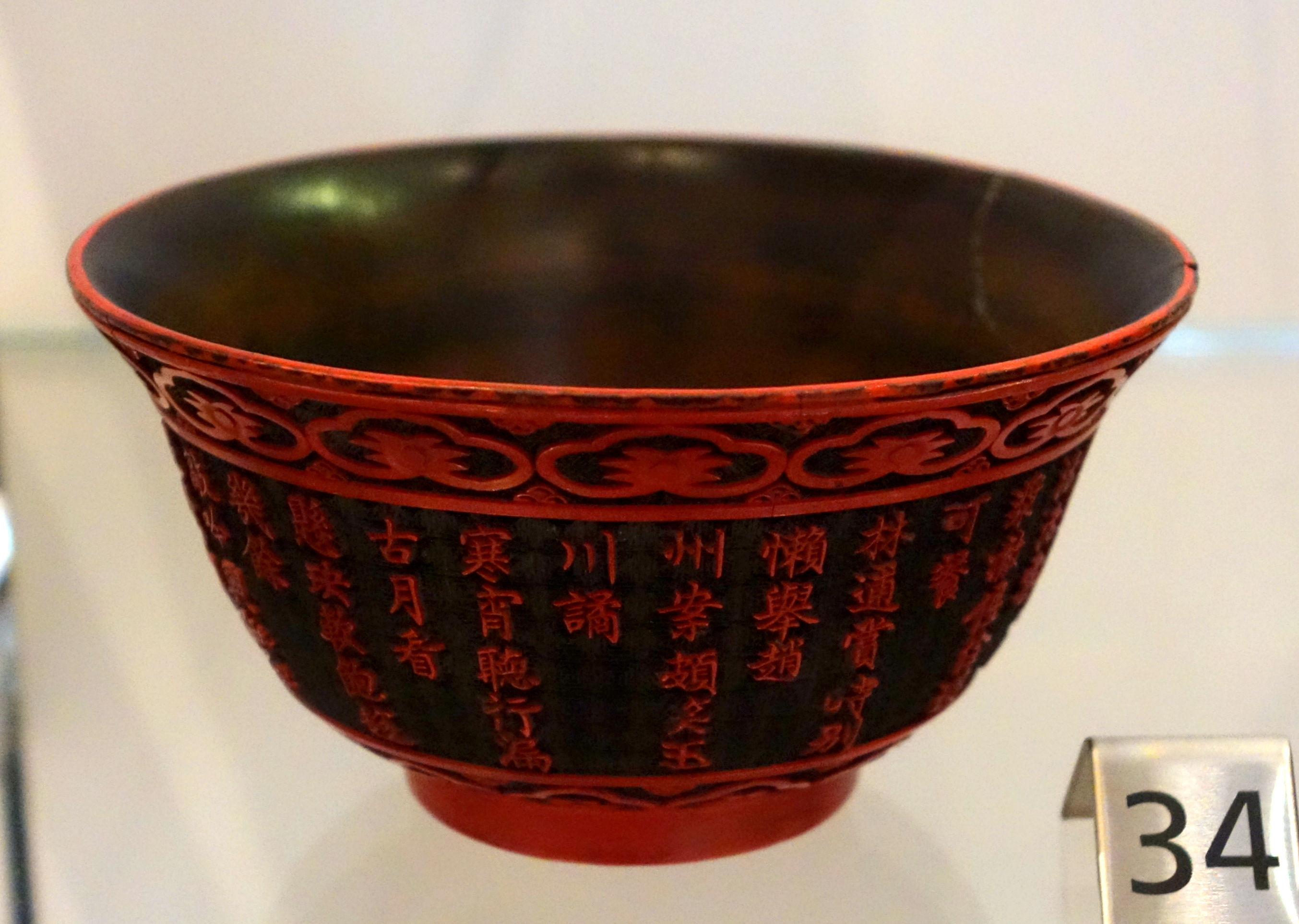
Carved lacquer cup with a poem composed by the Qianlong Emperor (1735–1796), Qing dynasty

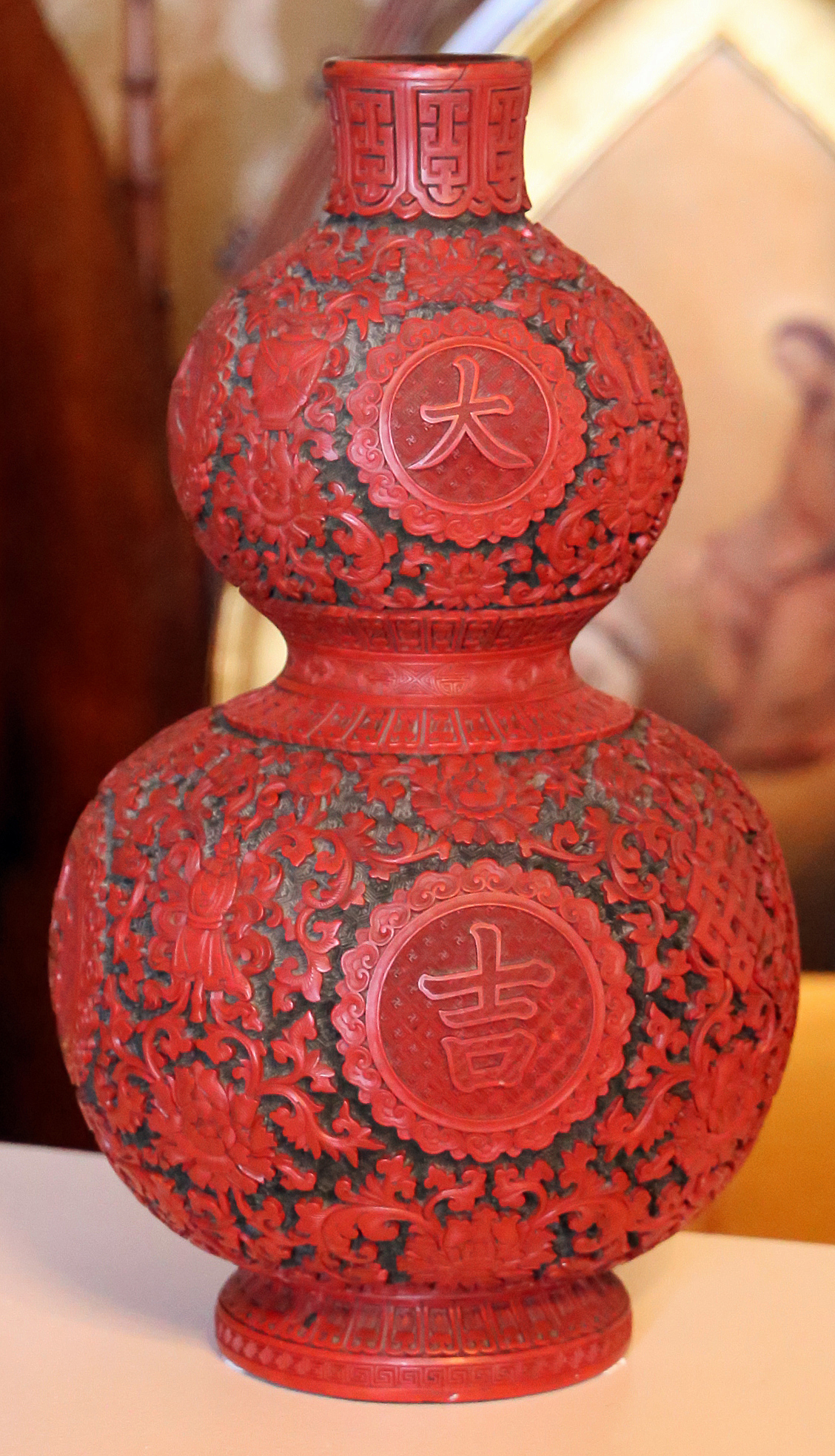
Carved lacquer calabash-bottle, Qing dynasty

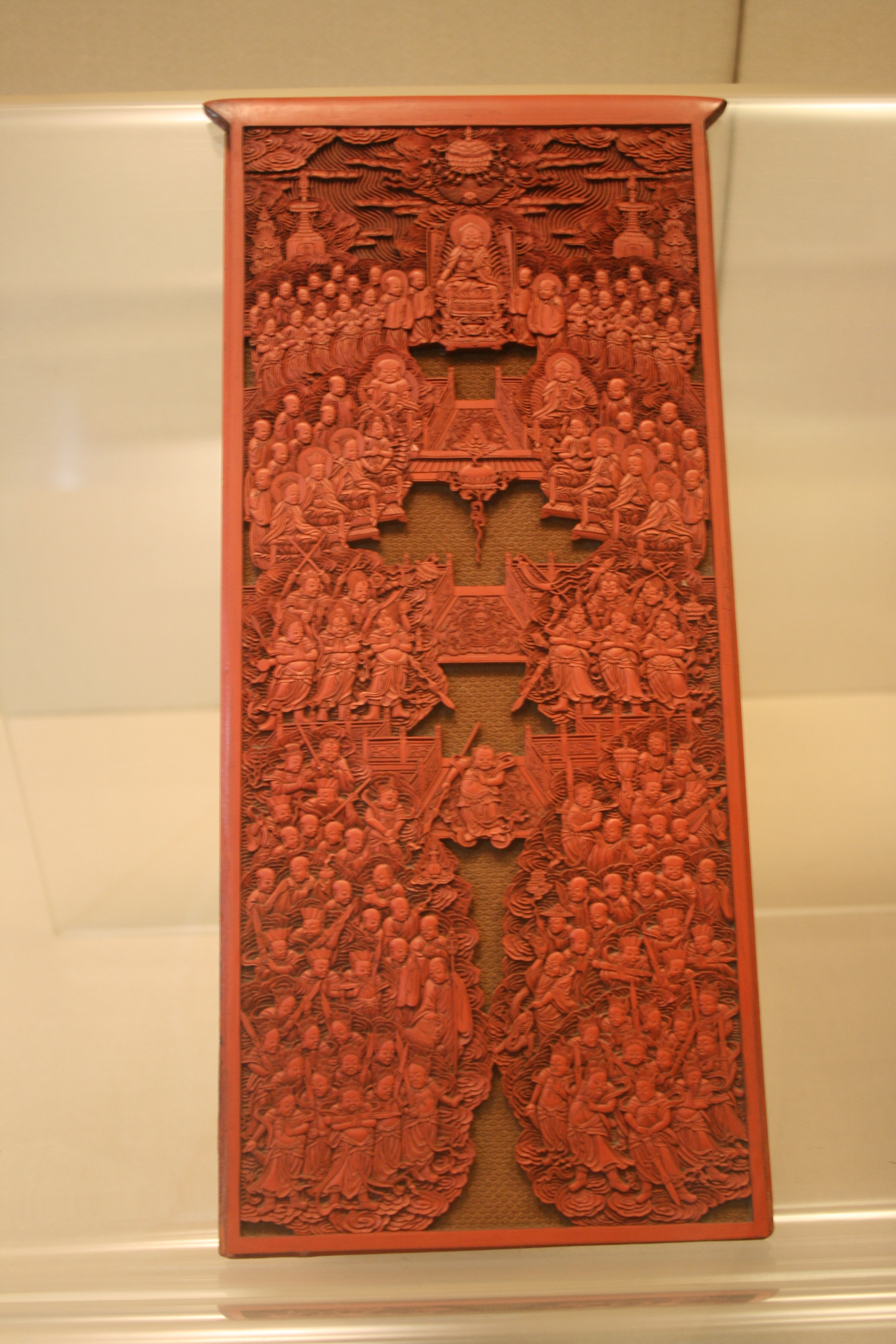
Lacquered Scripture Box, Qing dynasty

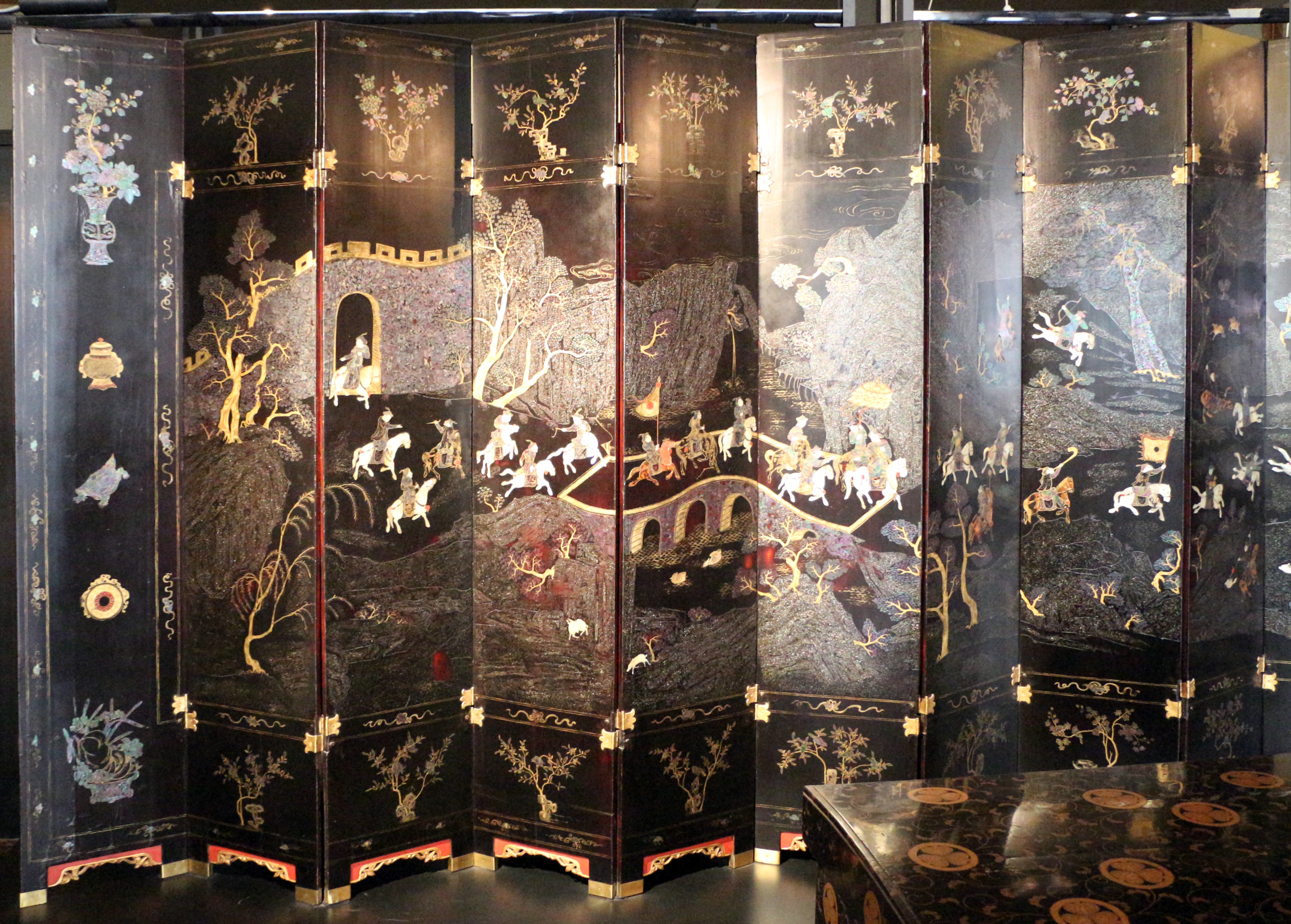
Coromandel lacquer folding screen with a courtly progress in lacquer, mother of pearl, tortoiseshell and gold, Qing dynasty, 1750–1800

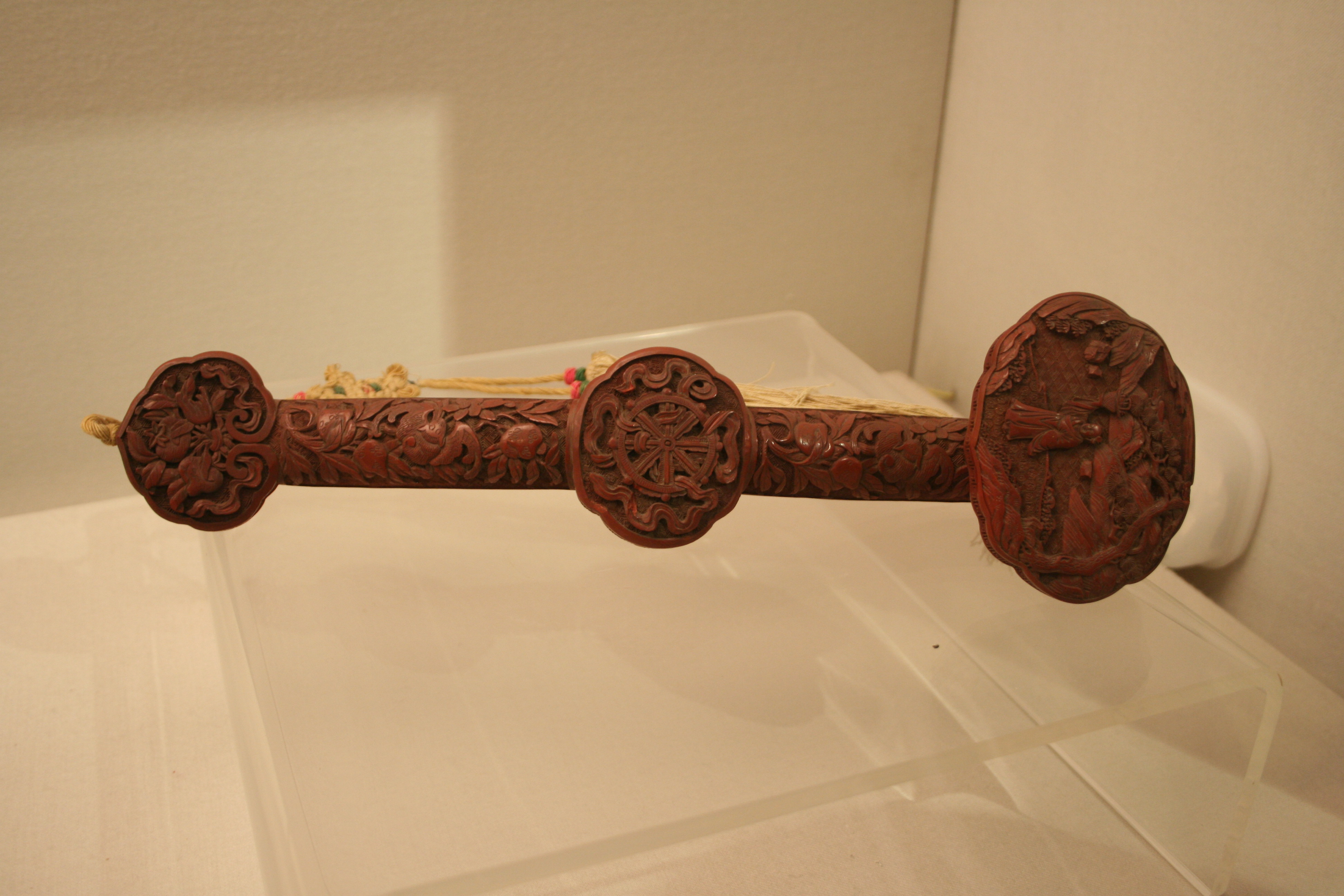
Carved lacquer ruyi, Qing dynasty

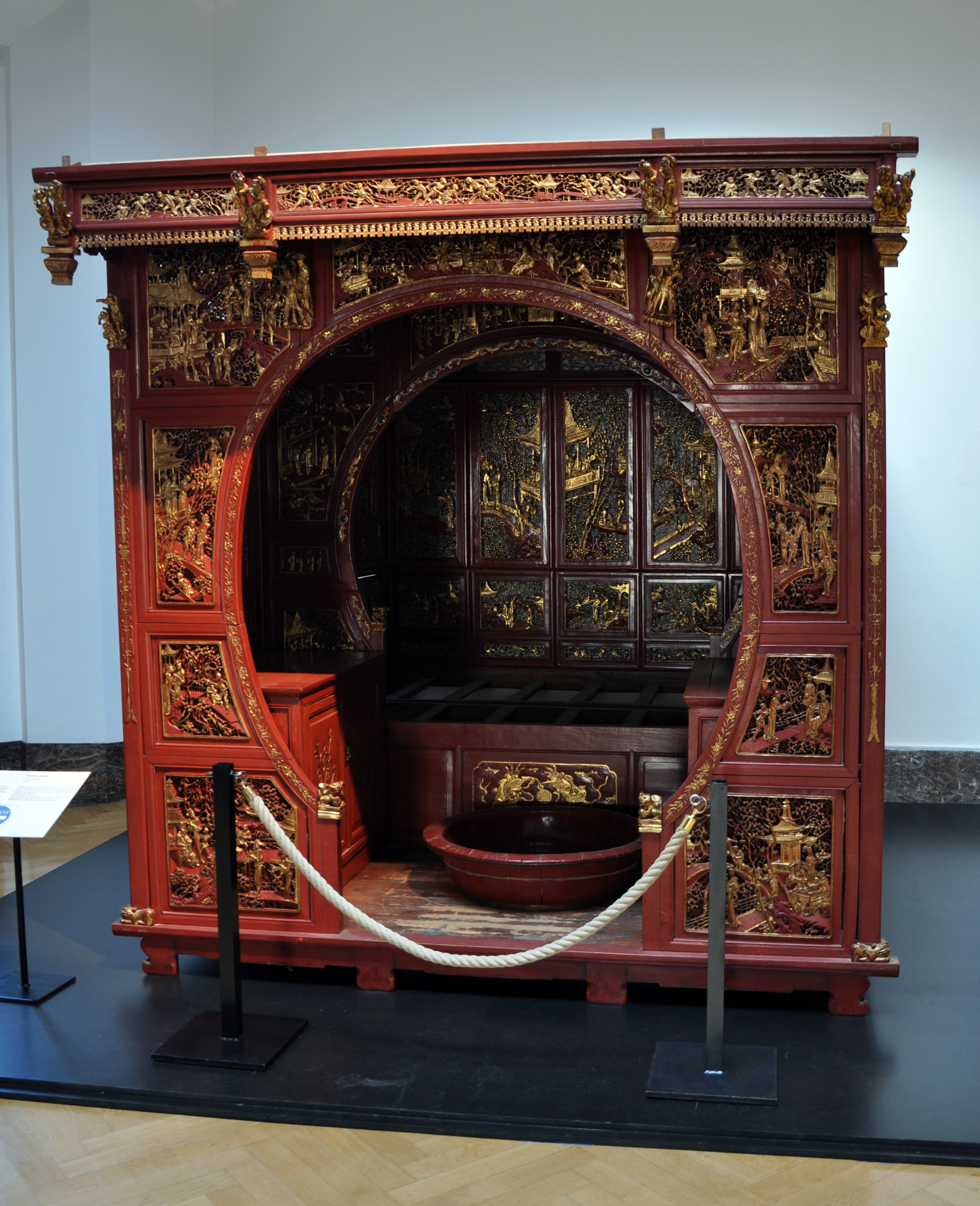
Lacquer canopy bed, Qing dynasty

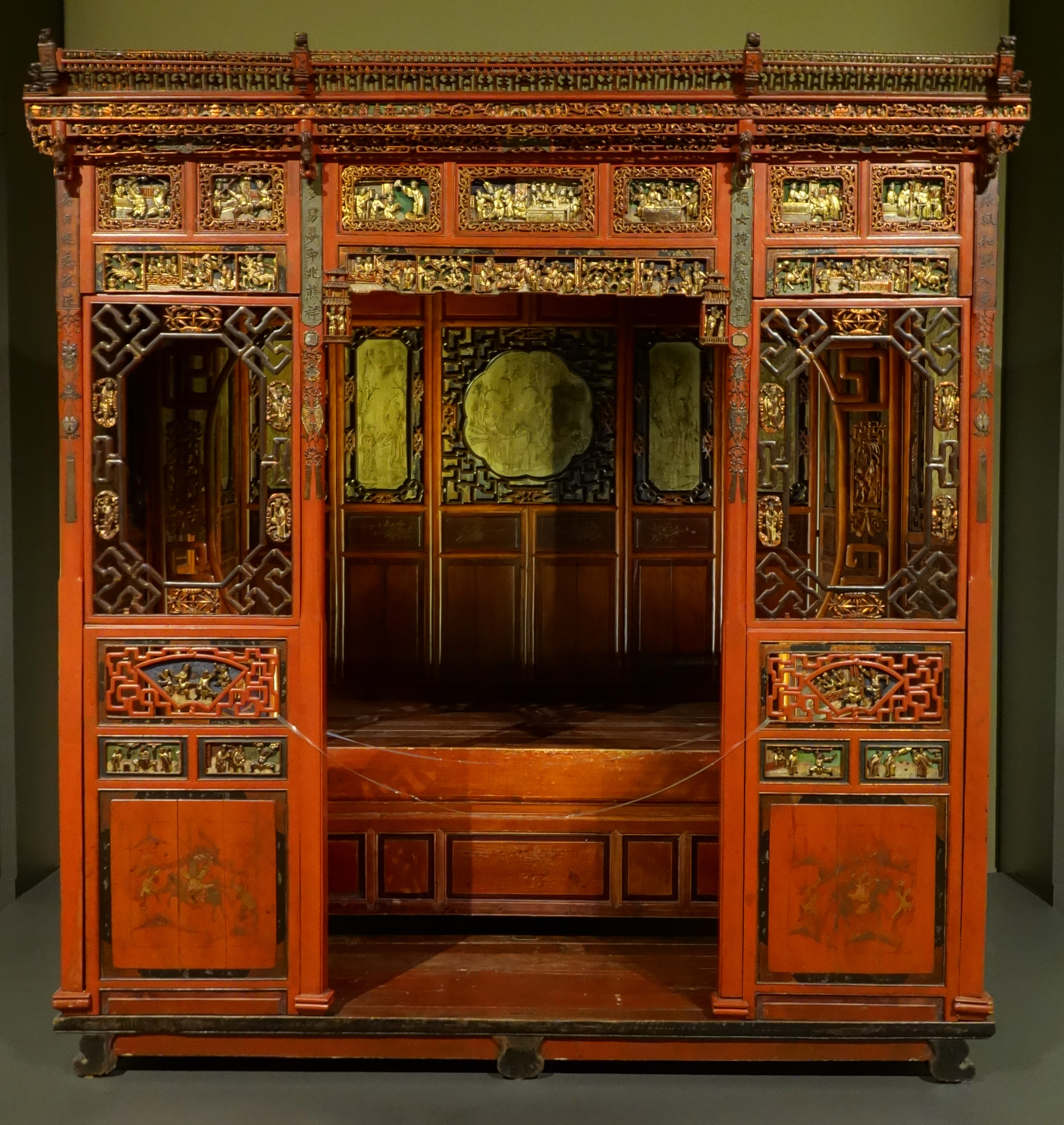
Lacquer canopy bed, Qing dynasty

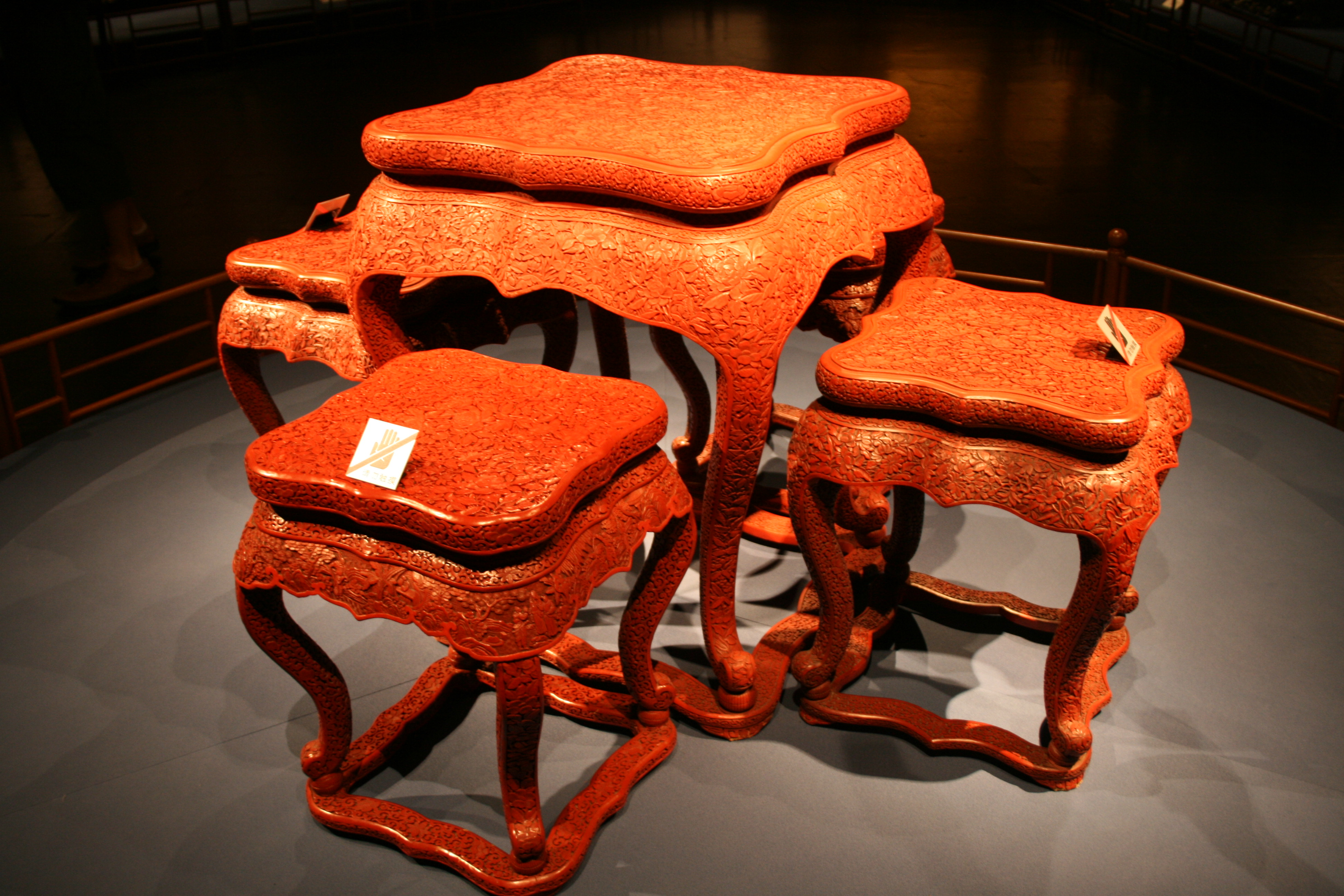
Lacquer table and chairs, Qing dynasty

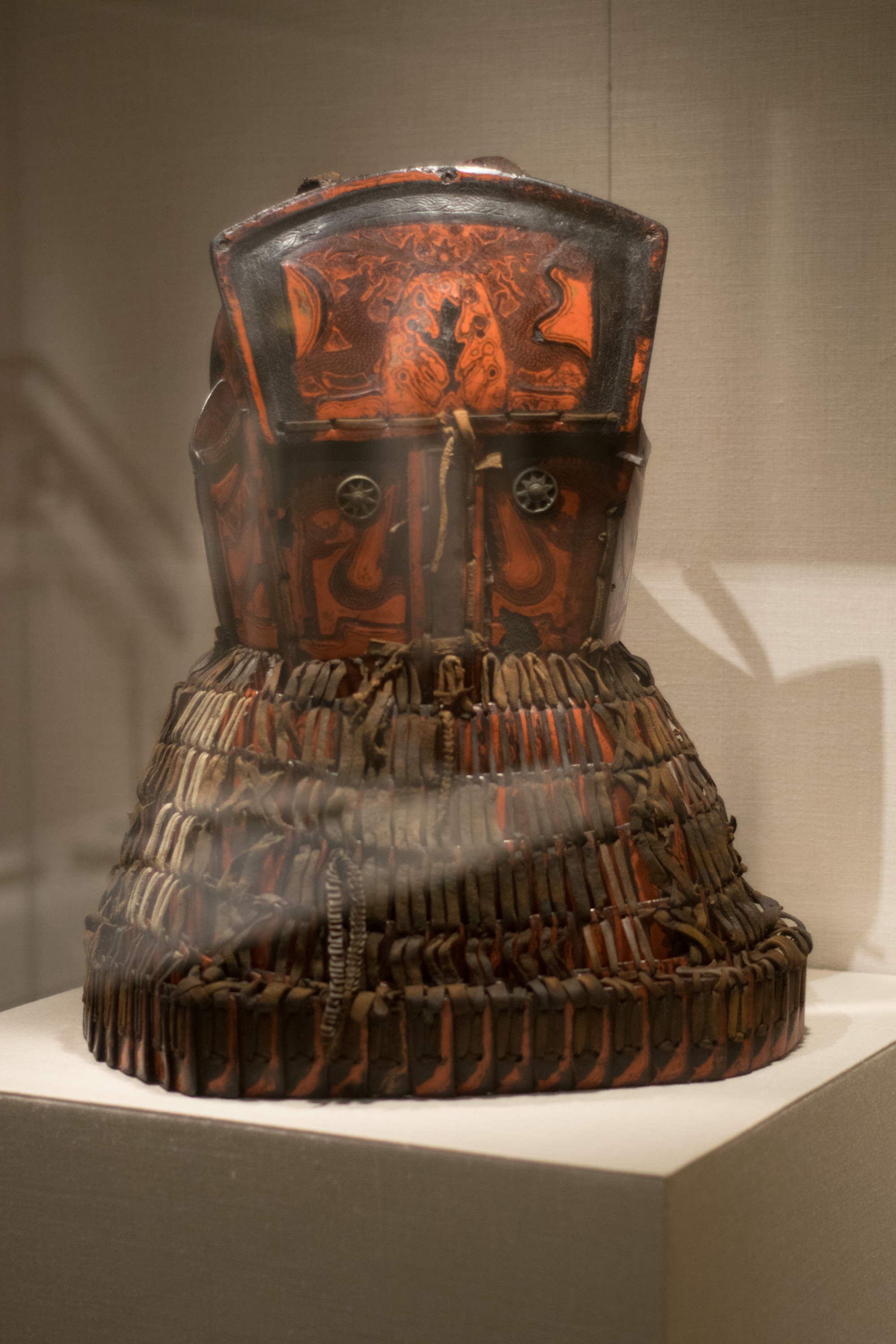
Lacquered armor of the Dali Kingdom

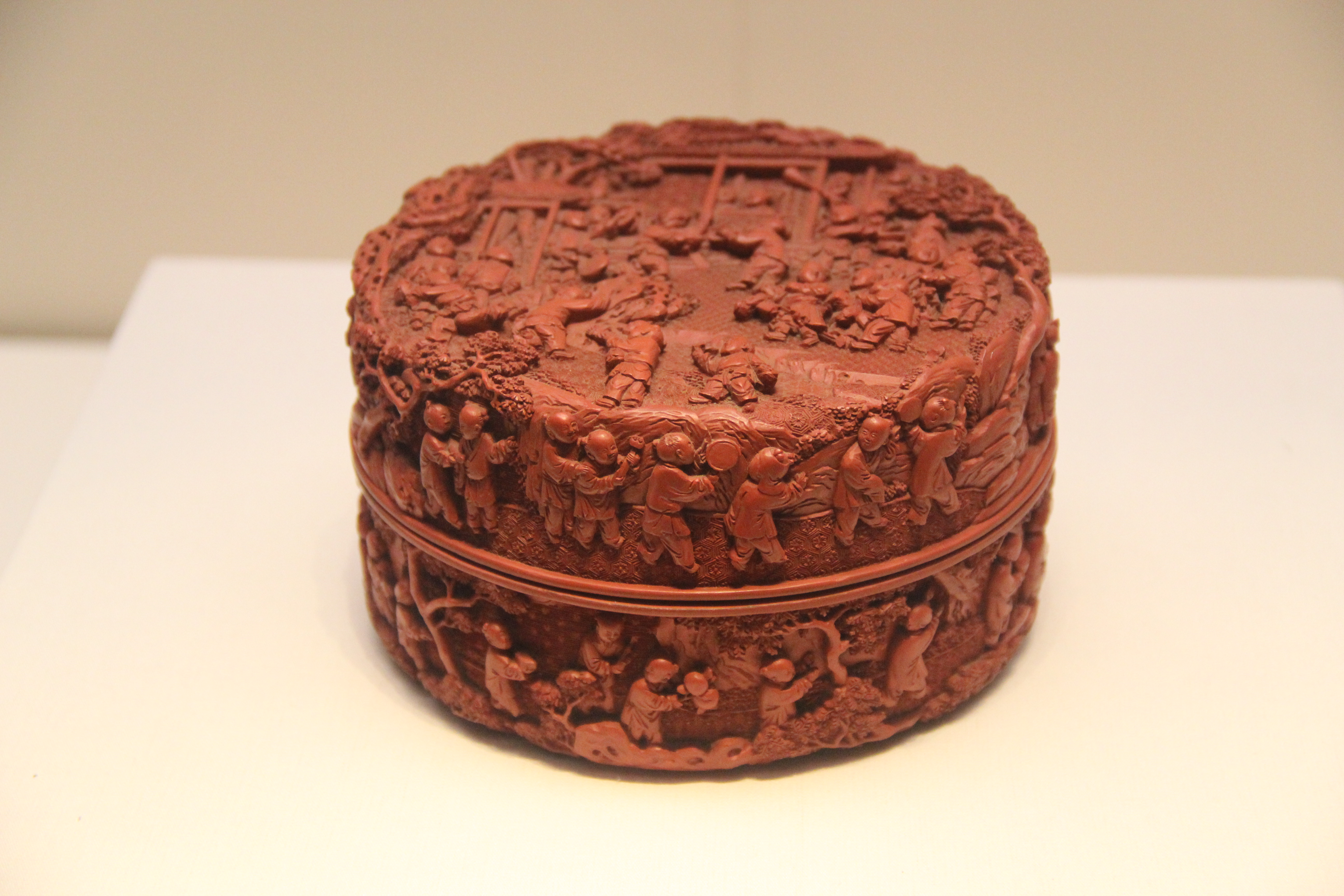
Qing dynasty Lacquered Box

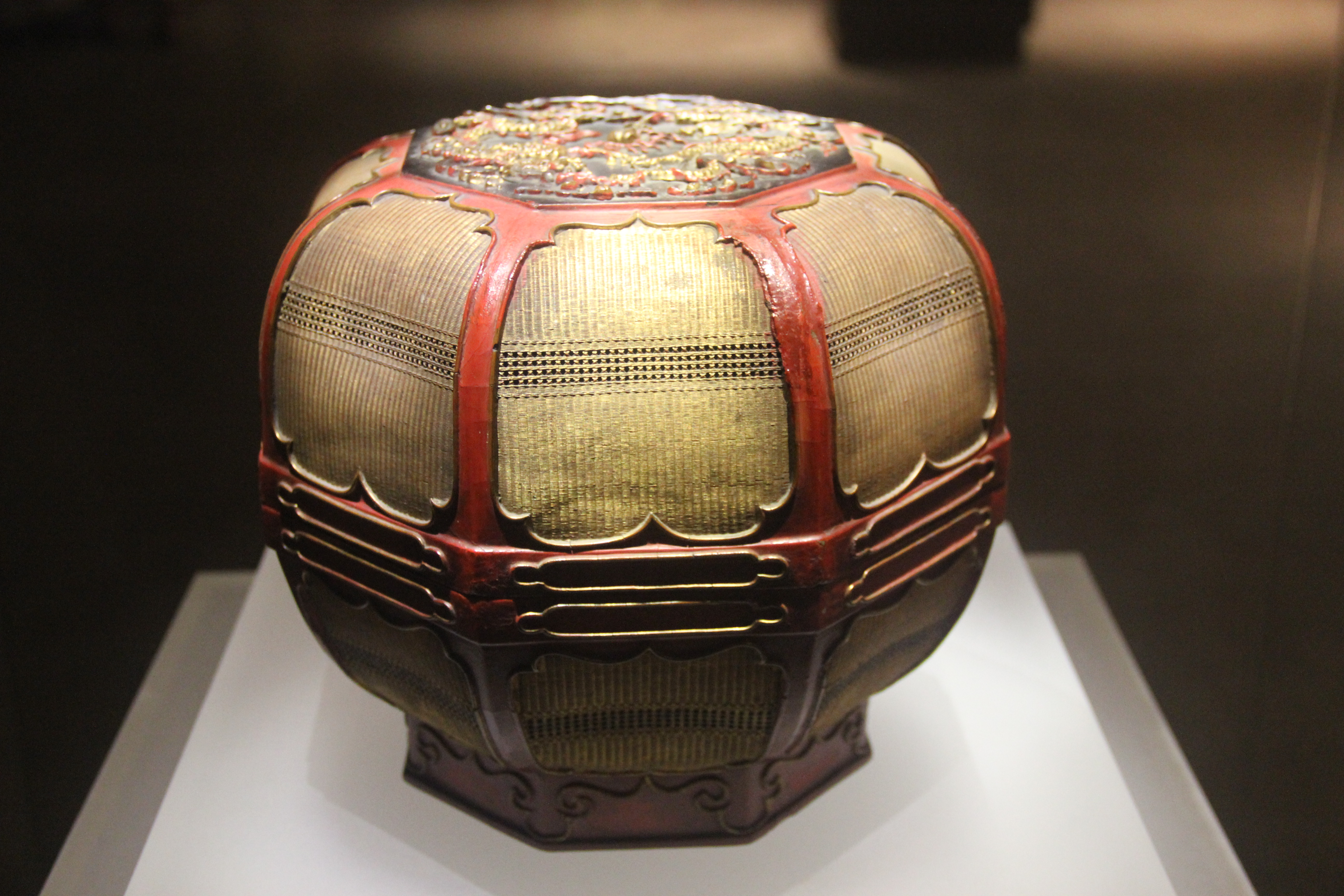
Woven Bamboo Lacquer Fruit Case, Qing dynasty

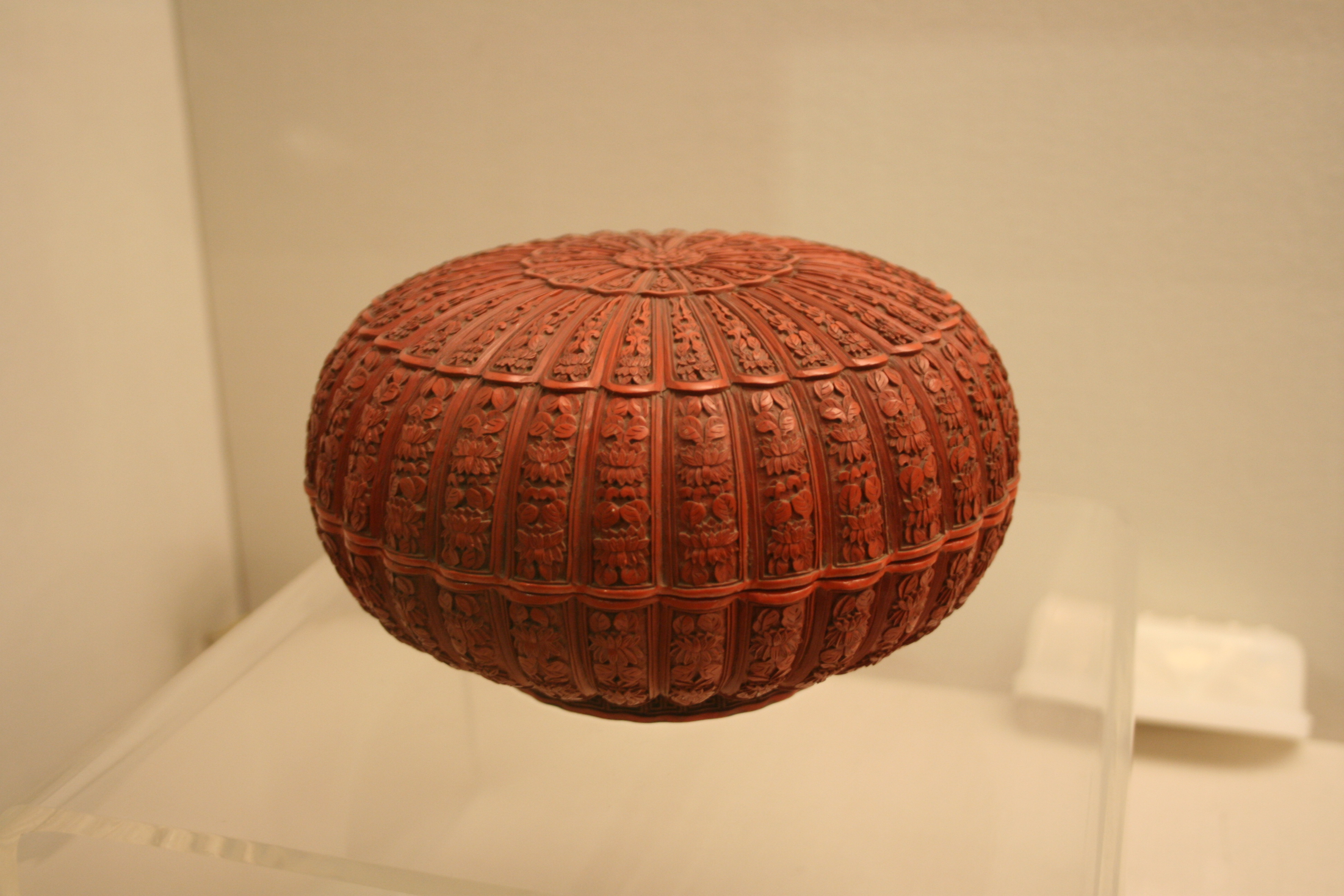
Qing dynasty Lacquered Box

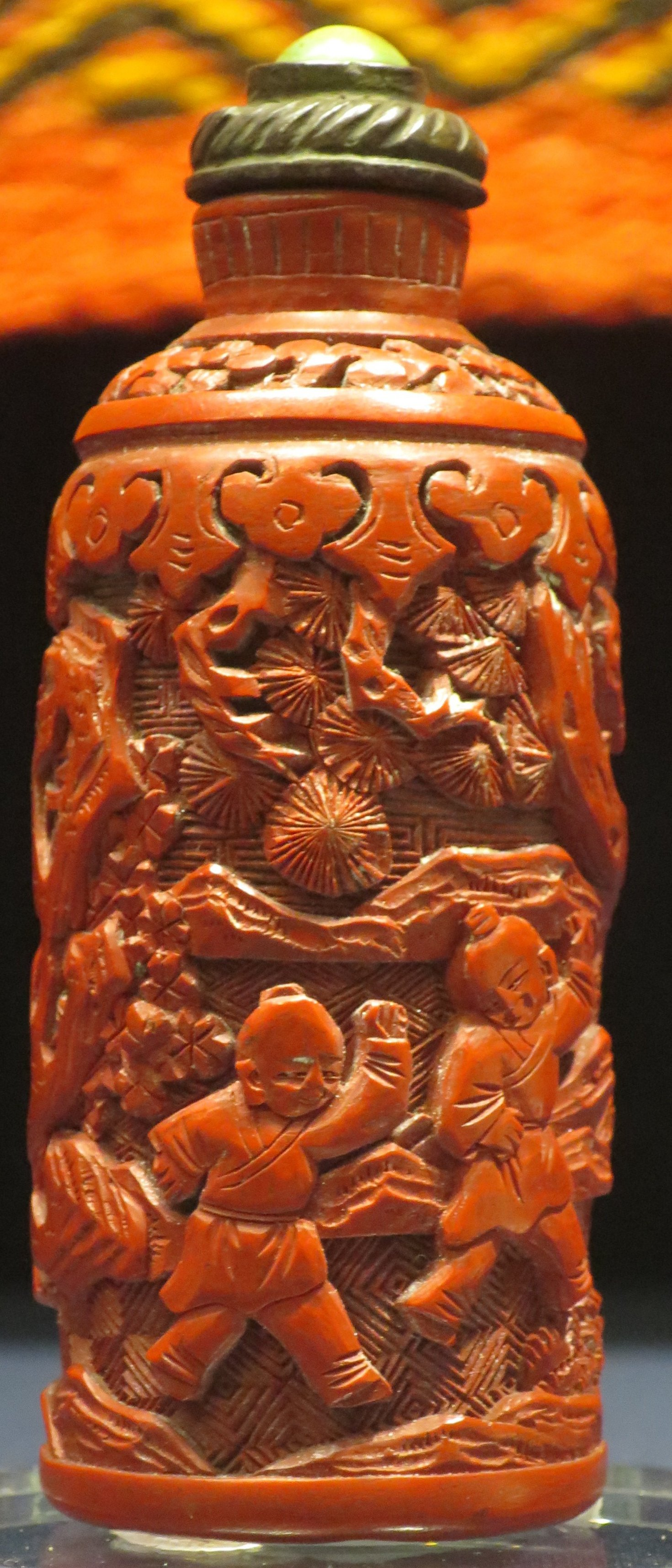
Qing dynasty carved lacquer snuff bottle.

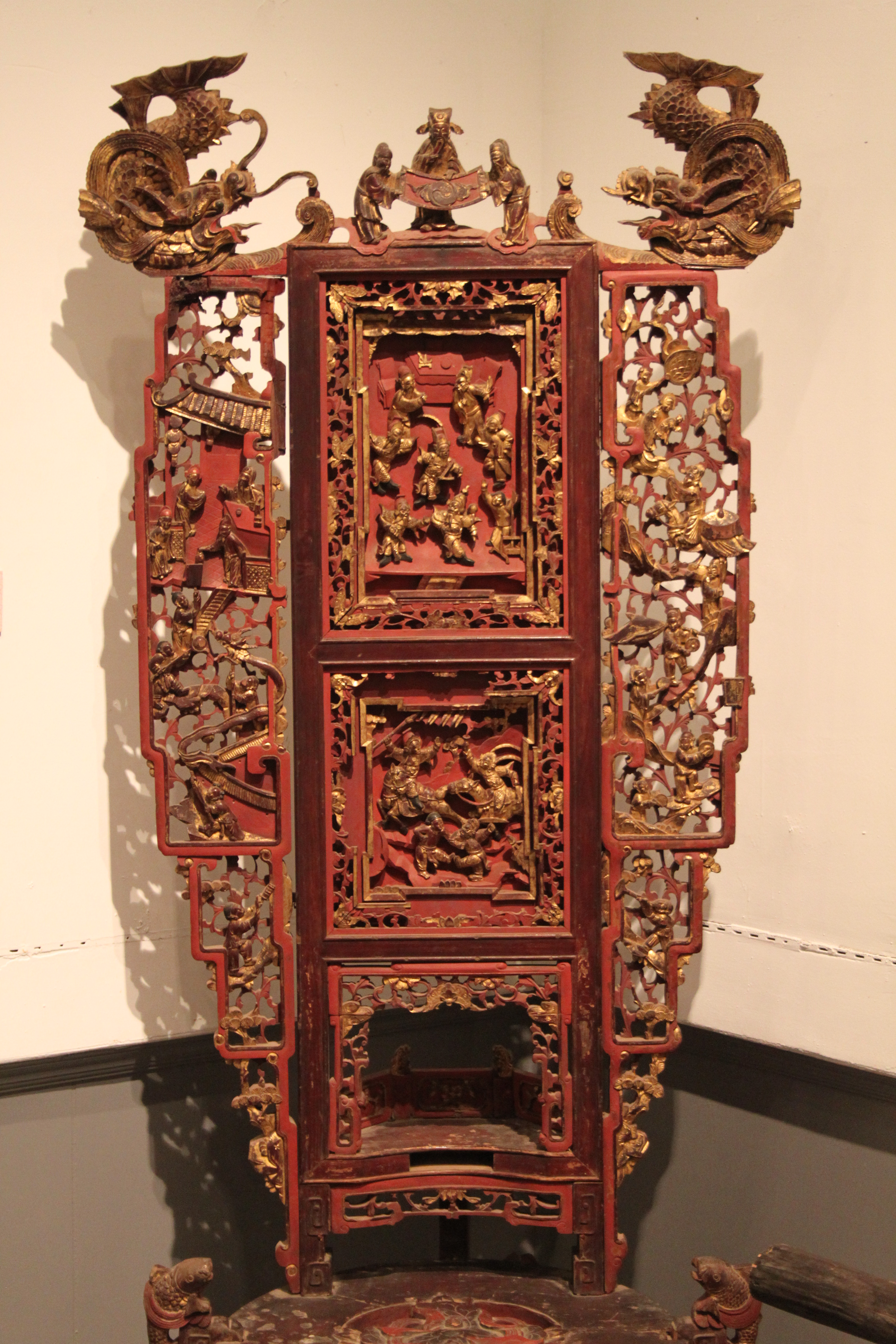
Carved lacquer chair, Qing dynasty

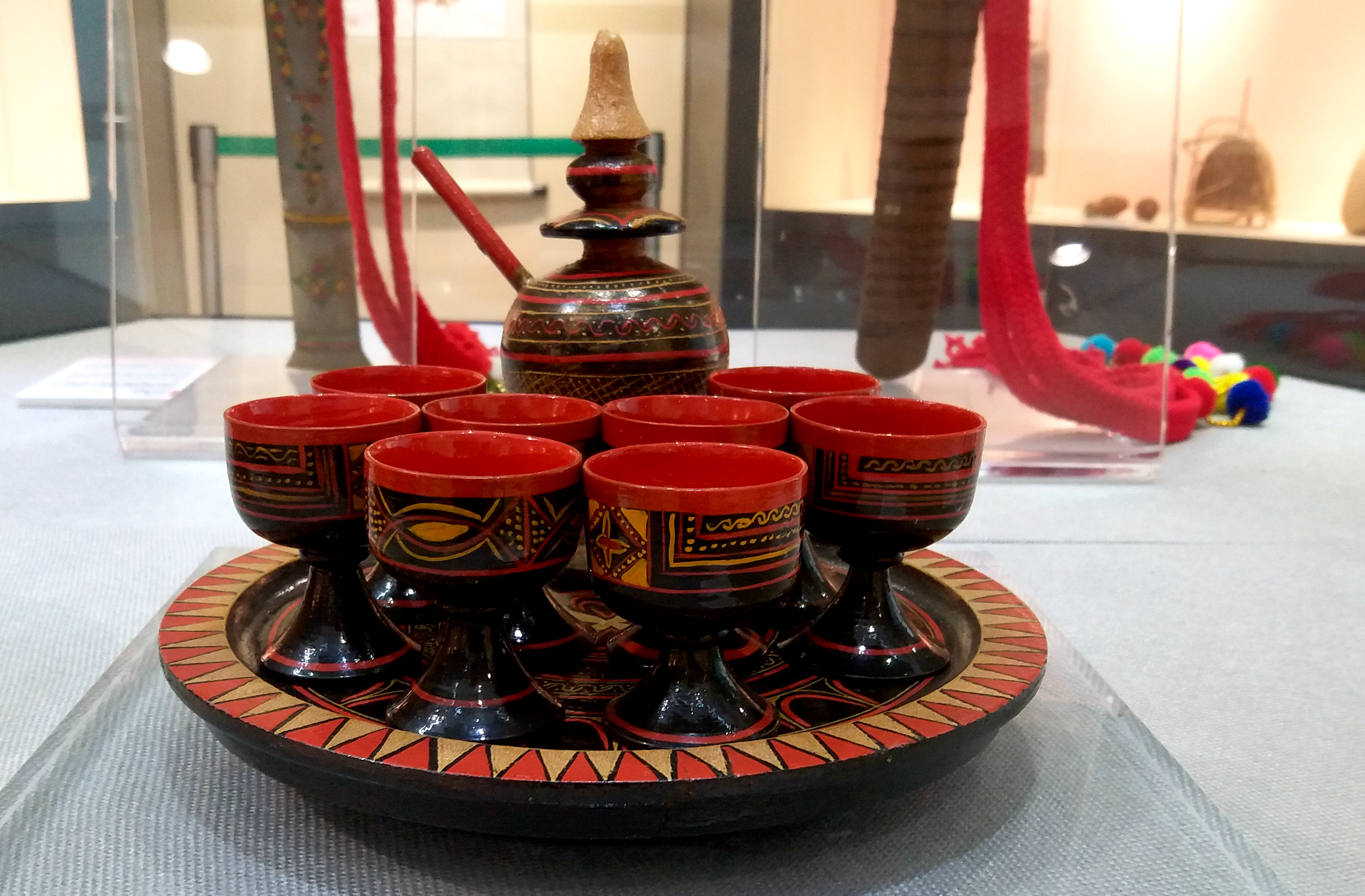
Lacquerware set by the Yi people.

=== Japanese lacquerware ===
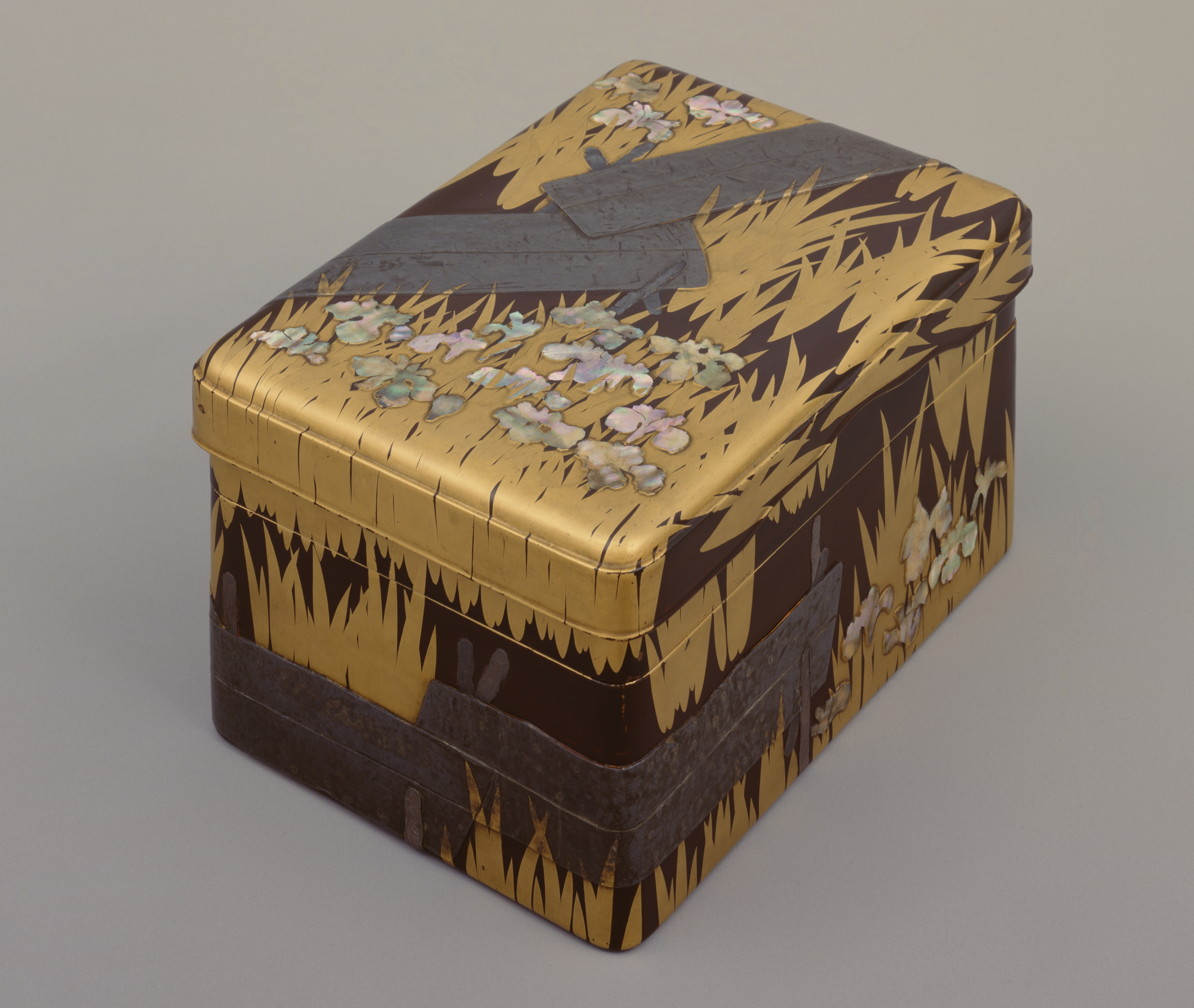
Writing lacquer box with Irises at Yatsuhashi, by Ogata Kōrin, Edo period (National Treasure)

The term for lacquer is urushi (漆), source of the English hybrid word "urushiol". Etymologically, urushi may be related to the words uruwashii ("beautiful") or uruoi ("watered", "profitable", "favored"), due speculatively to their value or shiny appearance, or perhaps the humidifying rooms used in production of lacquered wares. The term "Japanning" in the 17th century is a term for the technique used by Europe to emulate Asian lacquer, derived from the then famous Japanese lacquer.

The general characteristic of Japanese lacquerware is the widespread use of various Maki-e techniques compared to other countries. As a result, there are many works in which relatively vivid gold and silver patterns and pictures shine on the black base of lacquerware, and the entire lacquerware is covered with shiny gold and silver grains.

==== History and regional production ====
Primitive lacquer was used in Japan as early as 12,600 BC, during the Jōmon period.

Lacquer was used in Japan as early as 7000 BCE, during the Jōmon period. Evidence for the earliest lacquerware was discovered at the Kakinoshima "B" Excavation Site in Hokkaido. These objects were discovered in a pit grave dating from the first half of the Initial Jōmon period (approx. 9,000 years ago) Japanese lacquering technology may have been invented by the Jōmon. They learned to refine urushi (poison oak sap) – the process taking several months. Iron oxide (colcothar) and cinnabar (mercury sulfide) were used for producing red lacquer. Lacquer was used both on pottery, and on different types of wooden items. In some cases, burial clothes for the dead were also lacquered. Many lacquered objects have turned up during the Early Jōmon period; this indicates that this was an established part of Jōmon culture. Experts are divided on whether Jōmon lacquer was derived from Chinese techniques, or invented independently. For example, Mark Hudson believes that “Jomon lacquer technology was developed independently in Japan rather than being introduced from China as once believed”.

During the Asuka and Nara periods, between the 7th and 8th centuries, Chinese lacquer art forms were imported to Japan.

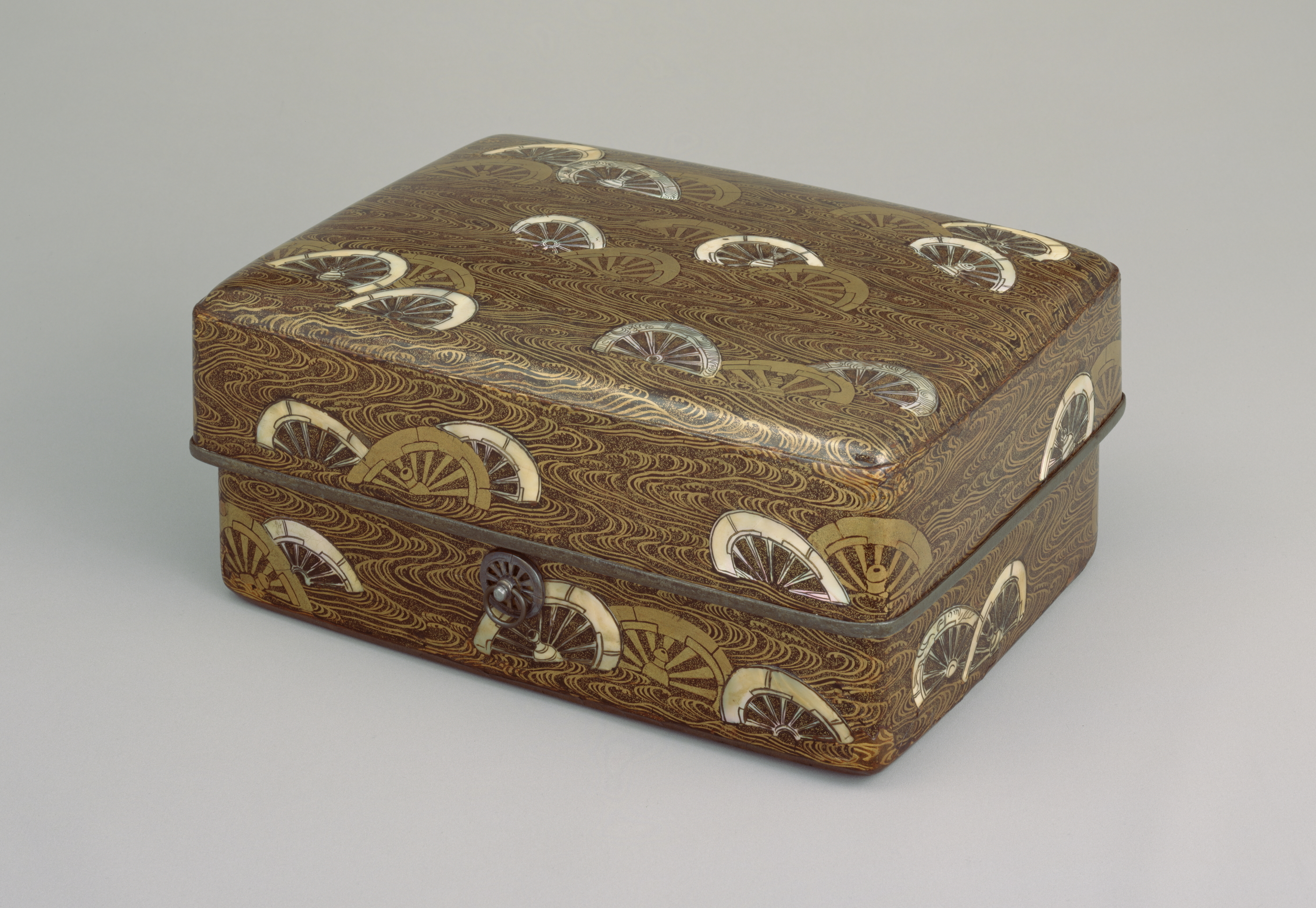
Cosmetic box Design of wheels-in-stream in maki-e lacquer and mother-of-pearl inlay, Heian period, 12th century (National Treasure)

In the Heian period (794–1185), various Maki-e techniques characteristic of Japanese lacquerware were developed. While the method of drawing designs with a brush by dissolving gold powder in lacquer is a common technique in other countries, the method of drawing designs with lacquer and then sprinkling gold, silver, or copper powder of various sizes and shapes on top to polish them was developed in Japan. This made it possible to make the gold and silver of lacquerware brighter than before.

In the Kamakura period (1185–1333), carved lacquer from the Song dynasty of China was imported to Japan. However, many Japanese lacquer craftsmen did not adopt the Chinese method of depositing lacquer and then carving it; instead, they created Kamakurabori, a method of carving wood and then coating lacquer.

A Japanese lacquerware produced and exported at the request of the Society of Jesus; Azuchi–Momoyama period, 16th century, Kyushu National Museum

Japanese lacquerware was abundantly exported to China where the Ming and Qing rulers generally described Japanese lacquerwares as " foreign lacquer " ( yangqi ). Yang Ming, and famous lacquer man Zhejiang, made annotations for A Record of Decoration with Lacquer, ... People of the Ming dynasty once recorded: “The decoration art with lacquer coated with gold originated (maki-e) from Japan". Yang in the reign of Xuande of the Ming dynasty made a trip to Japan to study Japanese techniques, and a Japanese visited a Chinese imperial workshop in Beijing during the Ming dynasty. It is well documented that the Yongzheng Emperor had a formidable interest in Japanese lacquer, yangqi, and this was reflected in many of the works produced in the Imperial workshops during his reign. In the Azuchi-Momoyama period (1568–1600) also made its way into Colonial Mexico (Manila Galleons) and Europe by Nanban trade. Japanese lacquerware attracted European aristocrats and missionaries from Europe, and western style chests and church furniture were exported in response to their requests.

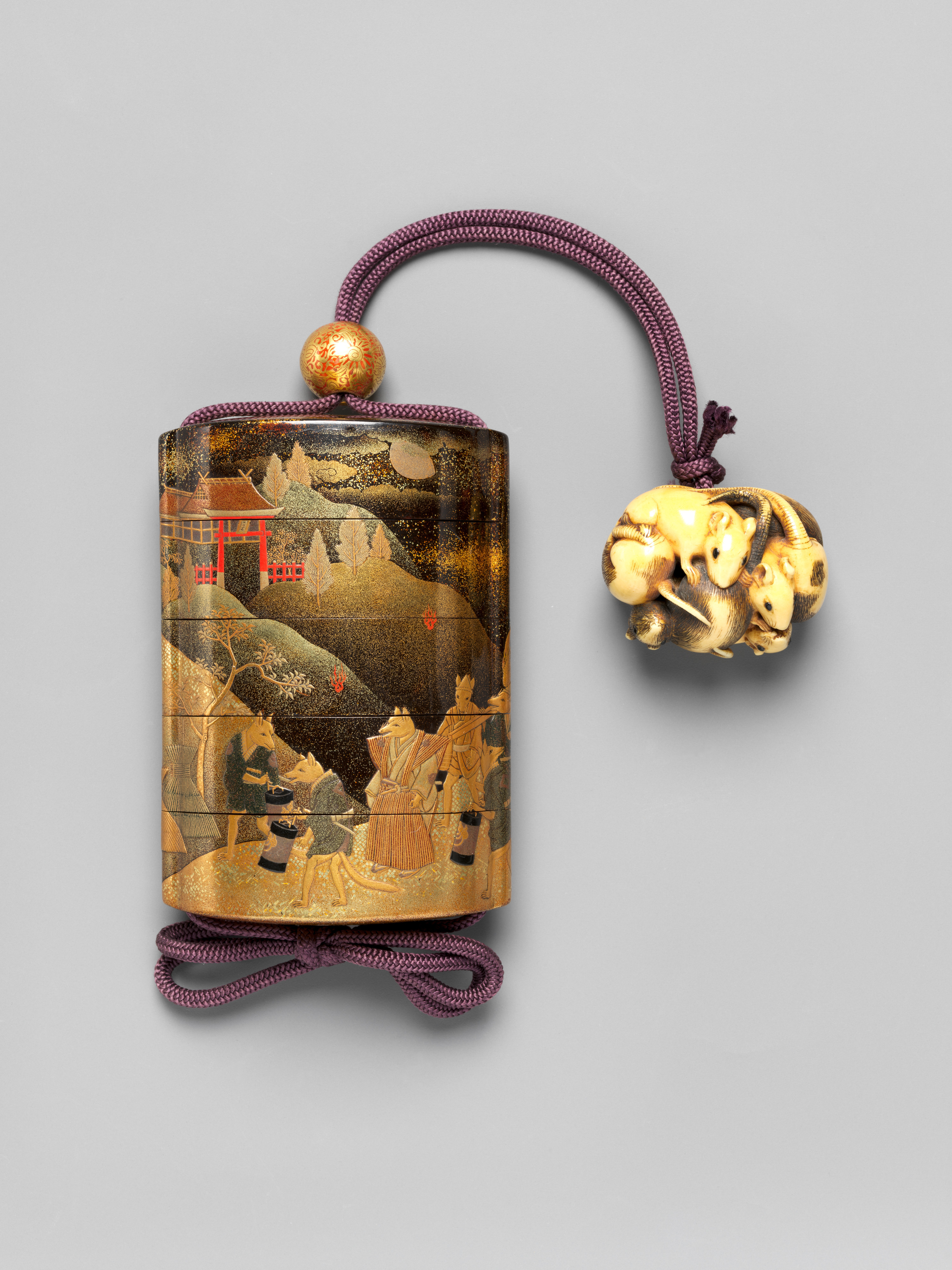
Inro with Fox's Wedding (Kitsune no yomeiri); Edo period, late 18th – early 19th century

The Edo period (1603–1868) saw an increase in the focused cultivation of lacquer trees and the development of the techniques used. In the 18th century colored lacquers came into wider use. With the development of economy and culture, the artistic quality of lacquered furniture has improved. Hon'ami Kōetsu and Ogata Kōrin brought the designs of the Rinpa school of painting into lacquerware. From the middle of the Edo period, inro became popular as men's accessories, and wealthy merchants of the chōnin class and samurai class collected inro of high aesthetic value, precisely designed with lacquer. Marie Antoinette and Maria Theresa are known collectors of Japanese lacquerware and their collections are now often exhibited in the Louvre and the Palace of Versailles.

In the Meiji period (1868–1912), Richly-decorated lacquerwares in original designs were popular domestically, and even more so with Western buyers during this period of European and American fascination with Japanese art. Shibata Zeshin's lacquer work was especially popular. In addition, lacquerware called Shibayama, which was created in the Edo period, became popular for its showy style, inlaid with gold, silver, shellfish, ivory, coral, tortoise shell and ceramics, and reached its peak during this period. Lacquerware called Somada, which was created in the Edo period and characterized by regular patterns of finely cut seashells, gold leaf and silver leaf, also became popular during this period. The government took an active interest in the art export market, promoting Japan's lacquers and other decorative arts at a succession of world's fairs. Lacquer from Japanese workshops was recognised as technically superior to what could be produced anywhere else in the world.

Today, the Japanese government has designated excellent lacquer artists as Living National Treasures and is encouraging them to make lacquerware. Lacquerware is produced throughout the Japanese archipelago, with many regional techniques and variations. Besides the very old Kamakura tradition mentioned above (and still alive today), the port town of Wajima provides a good example of regional lacquerware. Wajima-nuri, dating back to the 16th century, is characterized by use of the elm-like Japanese zelkova (keyaki 欅), powdered earth, and delicate features formed from cloth. (See the Japanese article, 輪島塗. A more complete list of regional lacquer traditions is available in the Japanese article.)

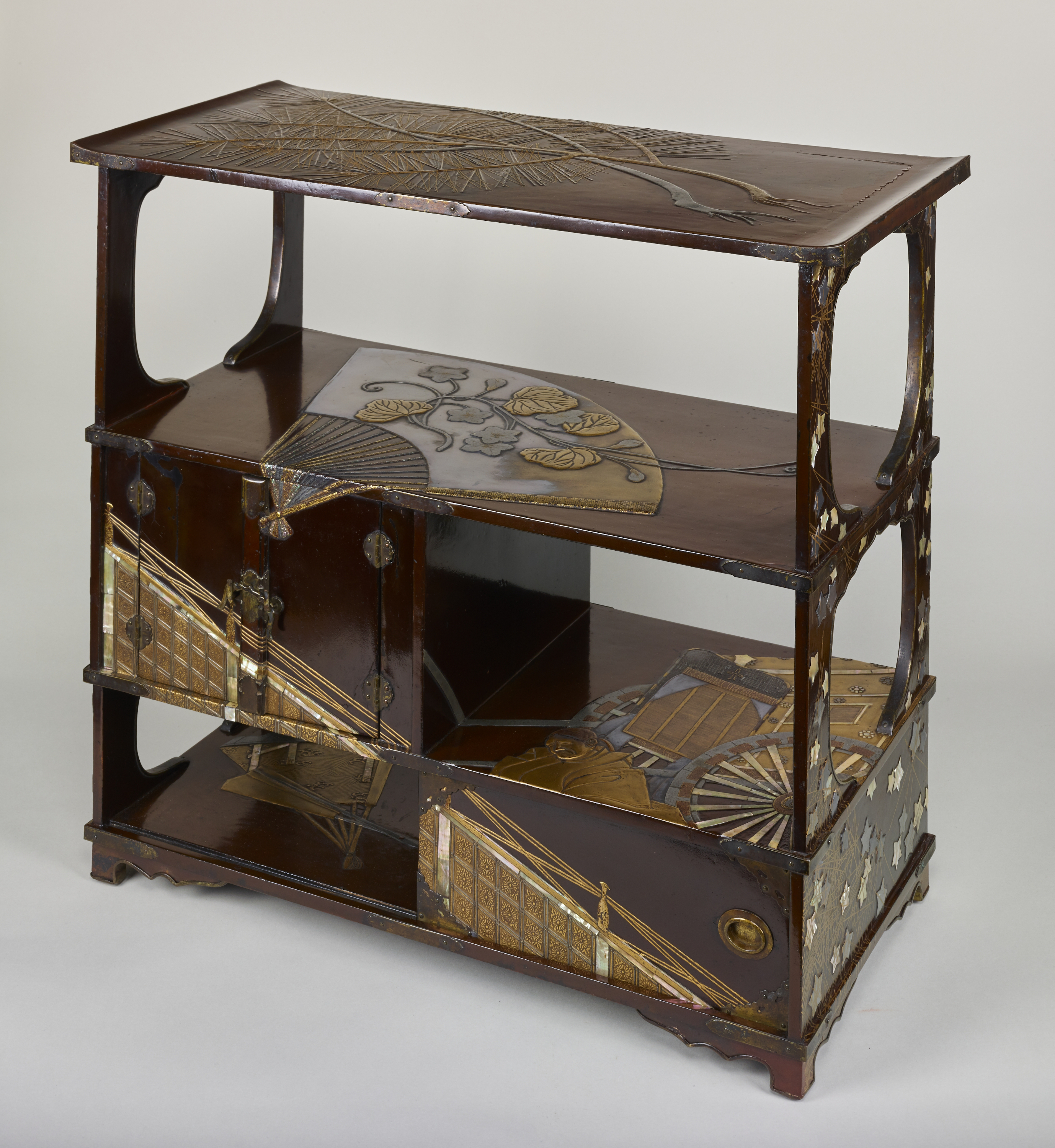
Tiered Stand with Designs Alluding to The Tale of Genji, by Hon'ami Kōetsu, 17th century

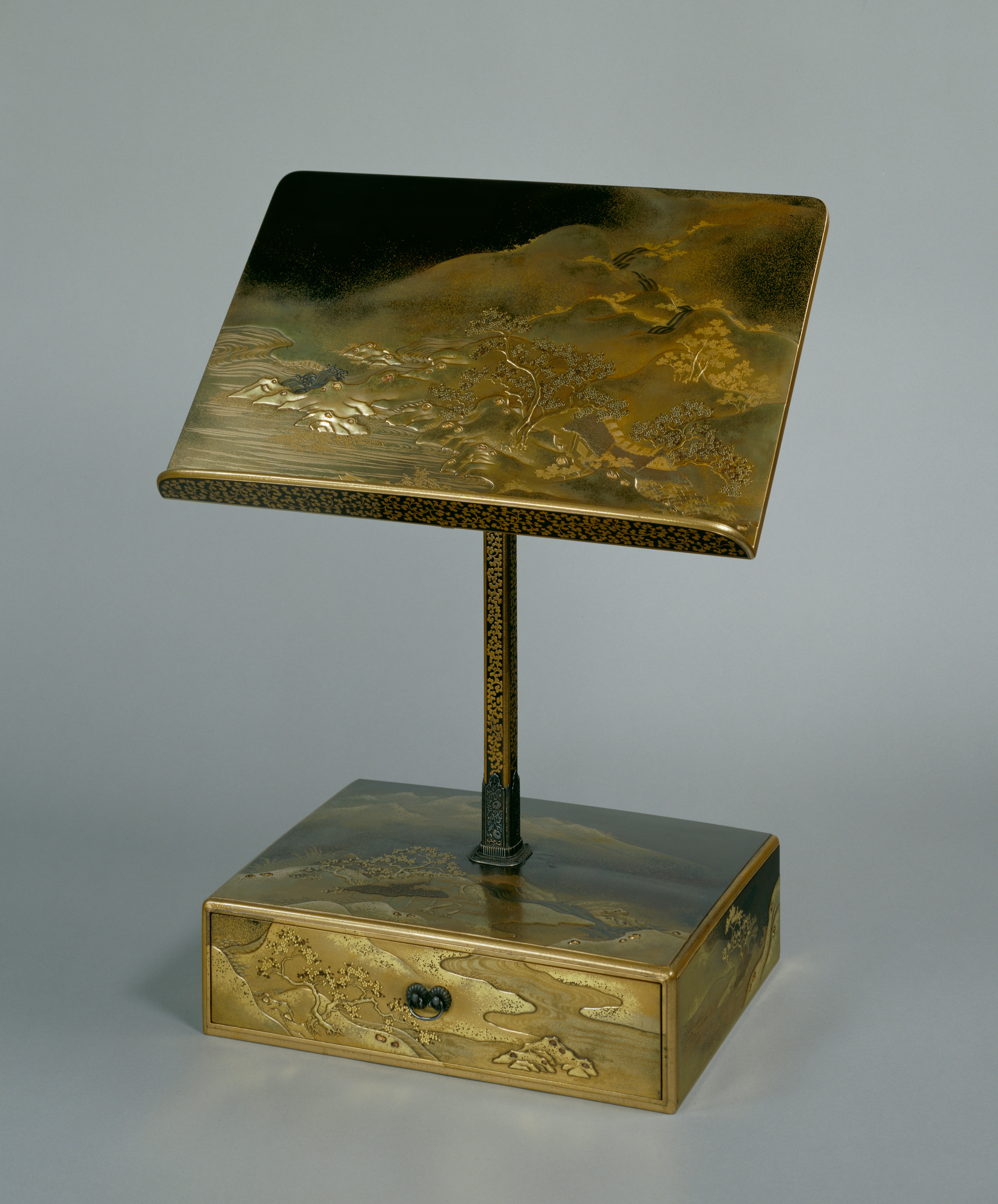
Reading Stand with Mount Yoshino, Edo period, 18th century

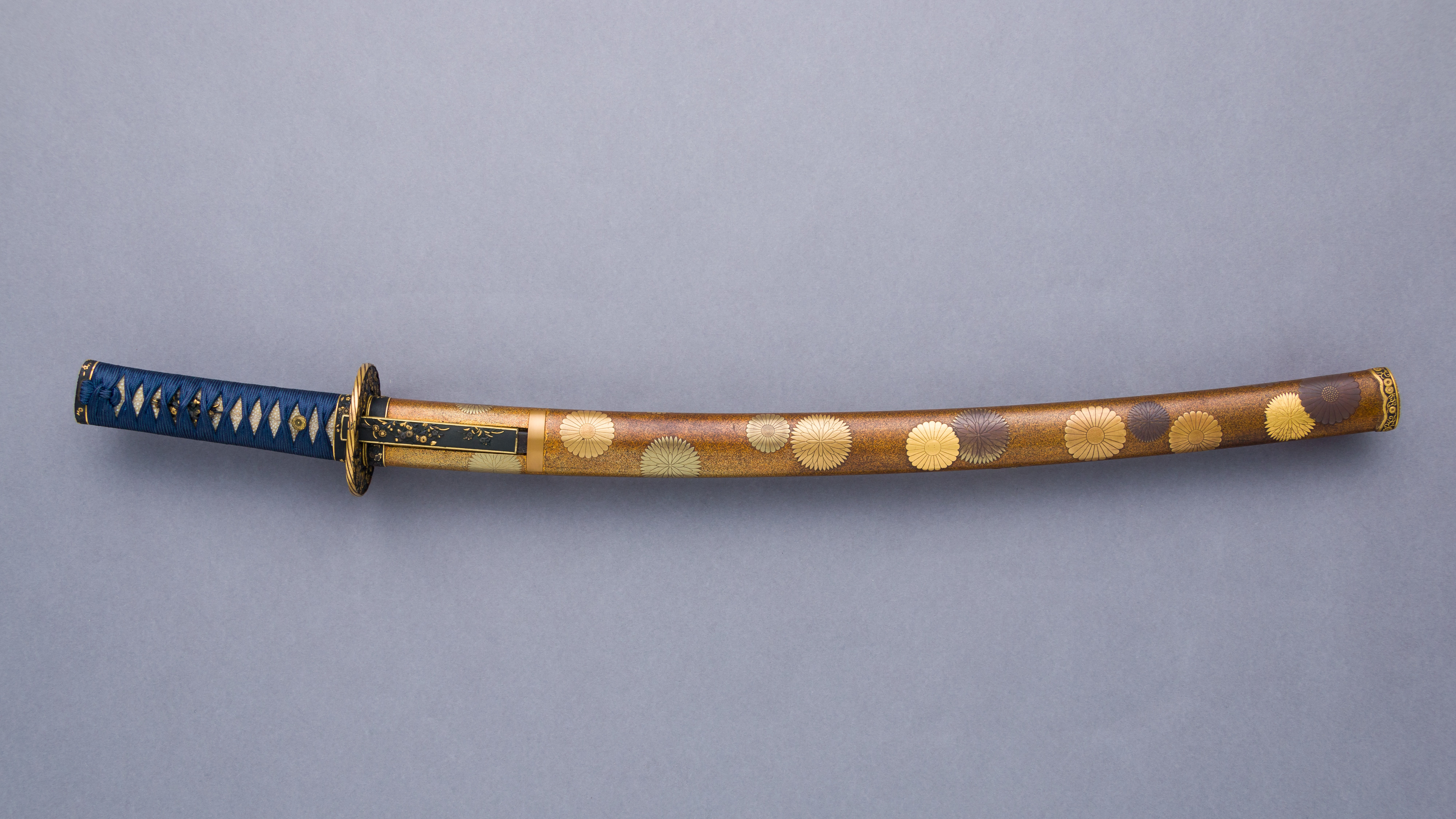
Lacquered exterior of wakizashi Fusamune, Edo period, 18th century

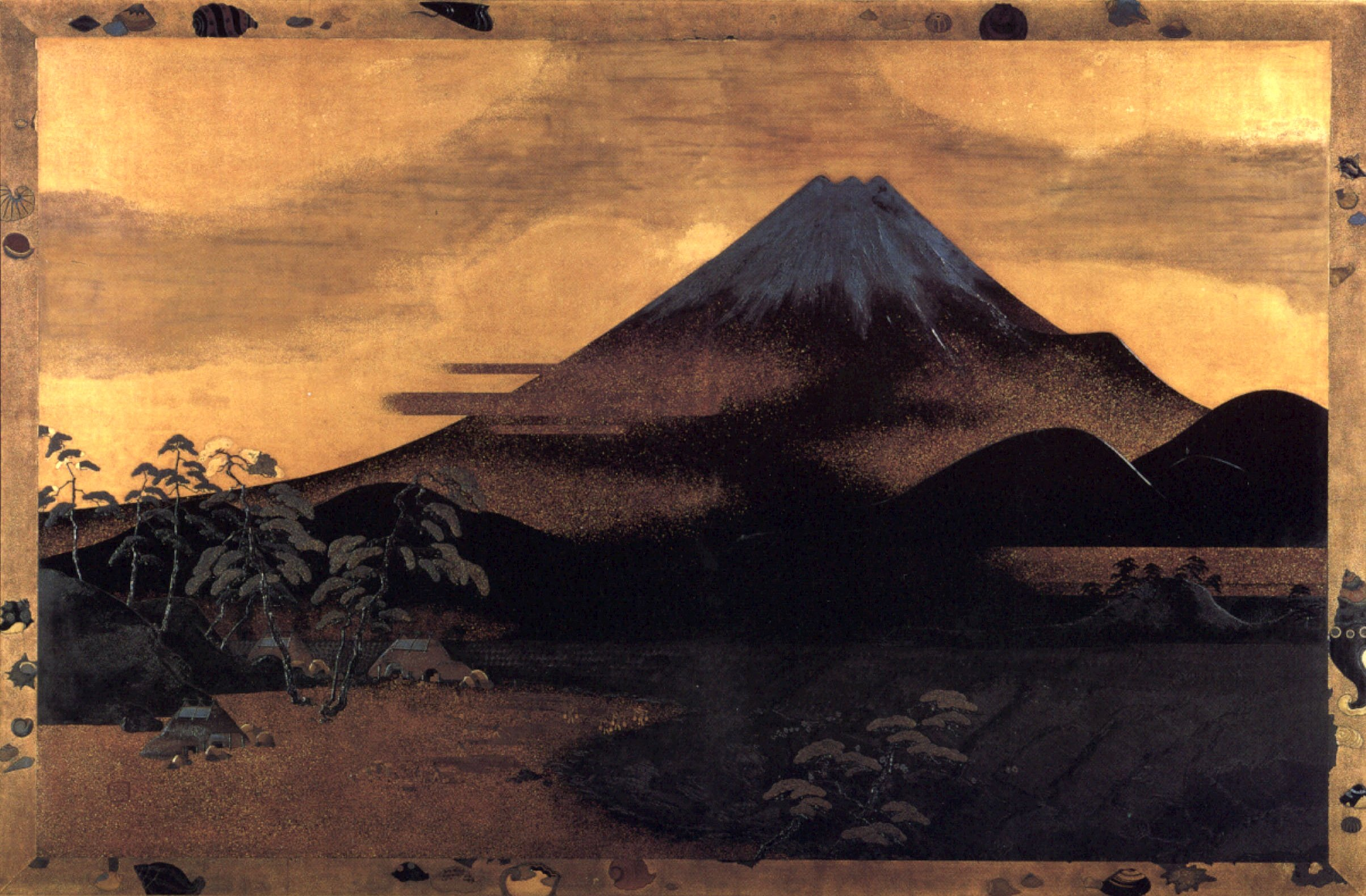
Maki-e Fuji Tagonoura, by Shibata Zeshin, Meiji period, 1872

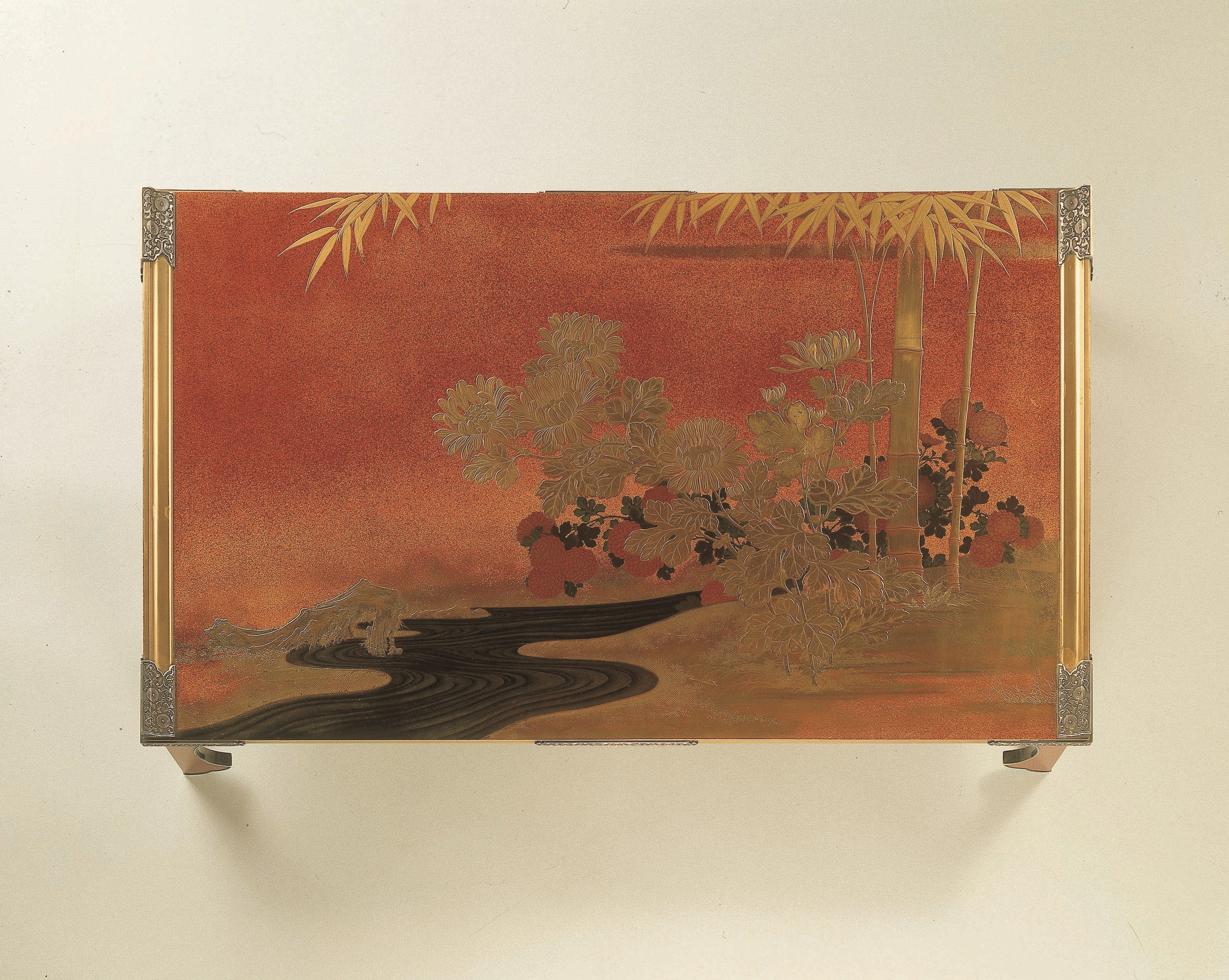
Maki-e Writing-table, by Shirayama Shosai, Meiji period, 19th century, Khalili Collection of Japanese Art

by Living National Treasure Gonroku Matsuda, Showa period, 1960

==== Ryukyuan lacquerware ====
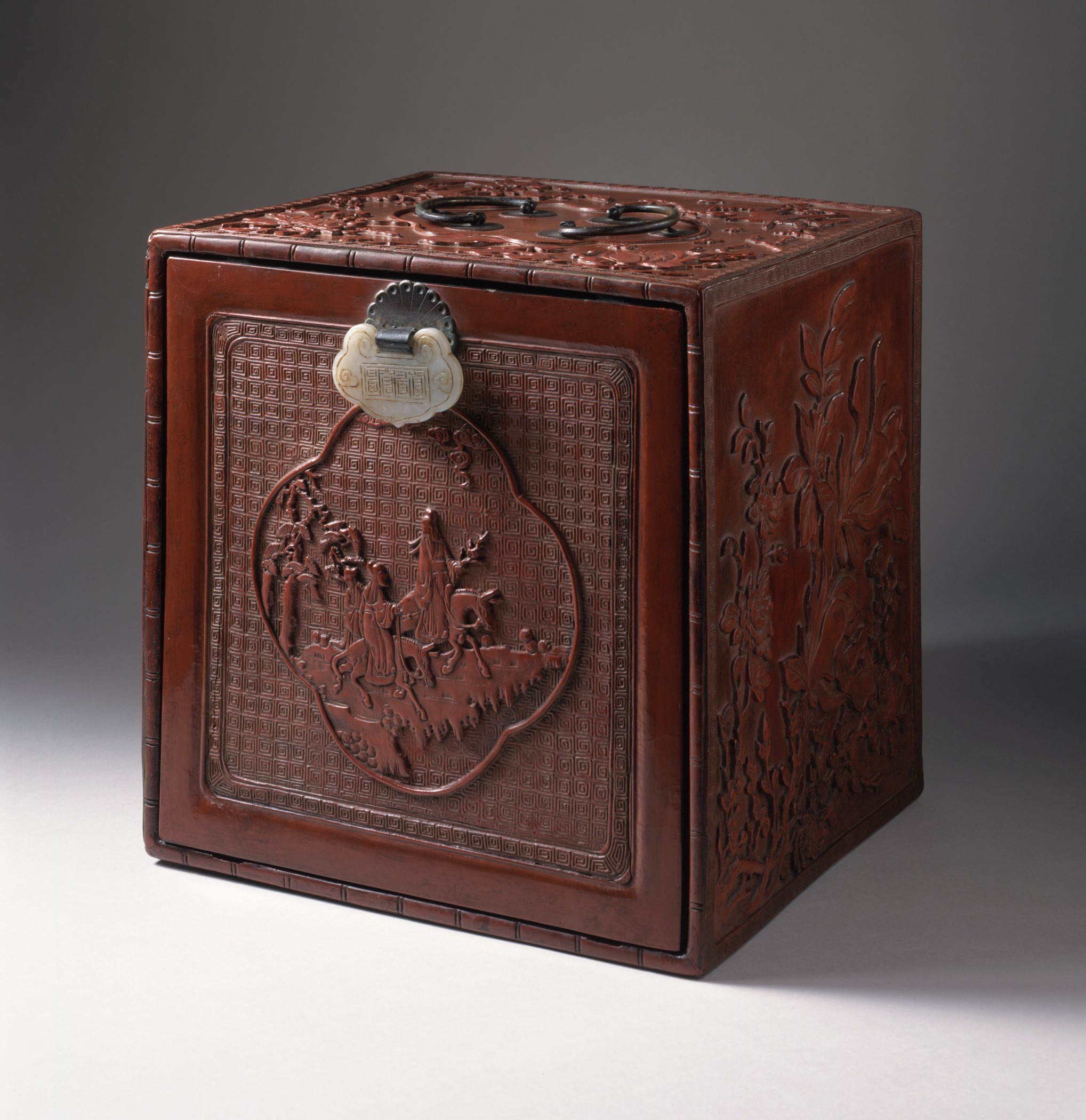
Chest with a cartouche and carved relief showing an outdoor scene, Ryukyuan lacquerware, c. 1750–1800

Ryukyuan lacquerware is one of the chief artistic products of the Ryukyu Islands (today Okinawa Prefecture of Japan); it is quite distinct from the lacquerware found among the surrounding cultures. Nevertheless, Chinese and Japanese influences are present.

=== Korean lacquerware ===
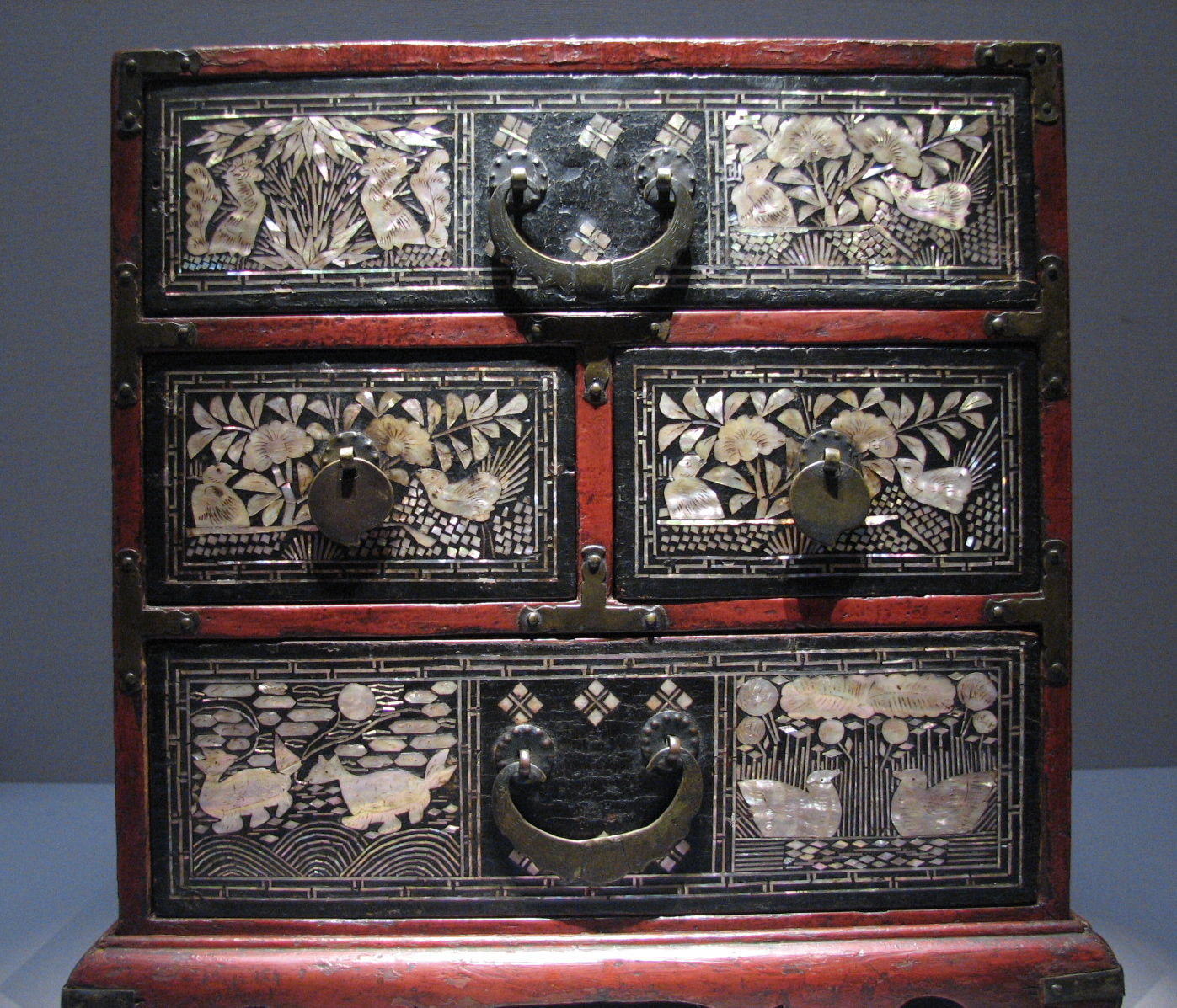
Joseon Period - National Museum of Korea in Seoul

The very term 'Najeonchilgi' is a combination of two particular words: 'najeon'– mother-of-pearl and ‘chilgi’ which refers to lacquerware. ‘najeon’ refers to the composite material which forms the inner shiny shell layer. The Three Kingdom period (57 B.C. – 668 A.D.) witnessed the introduction of the first method and the second one was introduced during the Shilla period (668–935 A.D.). The Goryeo dynasty (918–1392), considered the golden period of this craft, was influenced by Buddhism.

== Southeast Asia ==
=== Burmese lacquerware ===
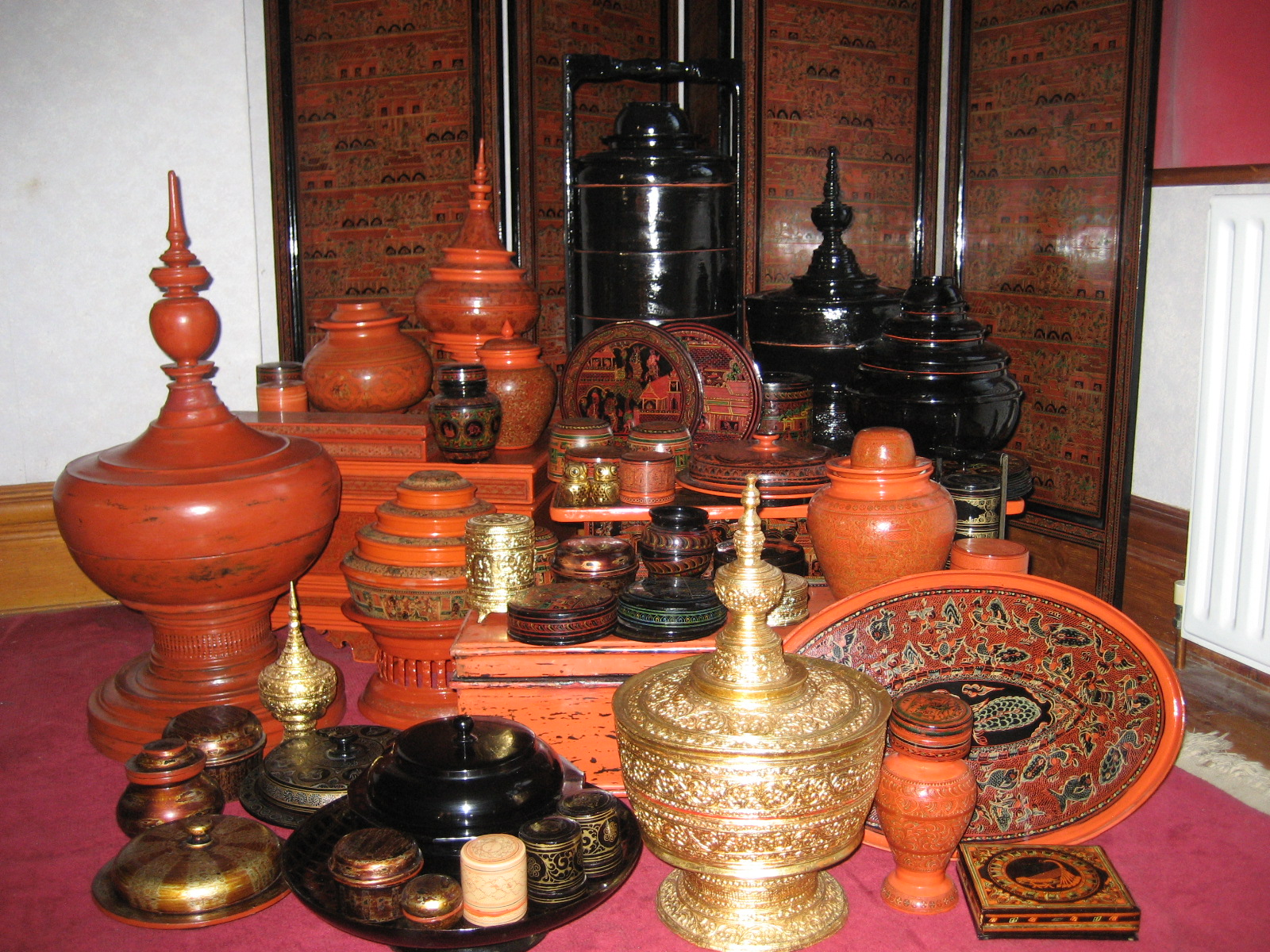
Burmese lacquerware – a private collection

Yun-de is lacquerware in Burmese, and the art is called Pan yun (ပန်းယွန်း). The lacquer is the sap tapped from the varnish tree or Thitsee (Gluta usitata, syn. Melanorrhoea usitata) that grows wild in the forests of Myanmar (formerly Burma). It is straw-colored but turns black on exposure to air. When brushed in or coated on, it forms a hard glossy smooth surface resistant to a degree from the effects of exposure to moisture or heat.

==== History ====
The earliest fragments of lacquerware basketry found in Bagan dates back to the 13th century. Evidence for older lacquerware in Bagan remains inconclusive.

Bayinnaung's conquest and subjugation in 1555–1562 of Manipur, Bhamo, Zinme (Chiang Mai), Linzin (Lan Xang), and up the Taping and Shweli rivers in the direction of Yunnan brought back large numbers of skilled craftsmen into Burma. It is thought that the finer sort of Burmese lacquerware, called Yun, was introduced during this period by imported artisans belonging to the Yun or Northern Thai people of the Chiang Mai region.

==== Manufacture and design ====
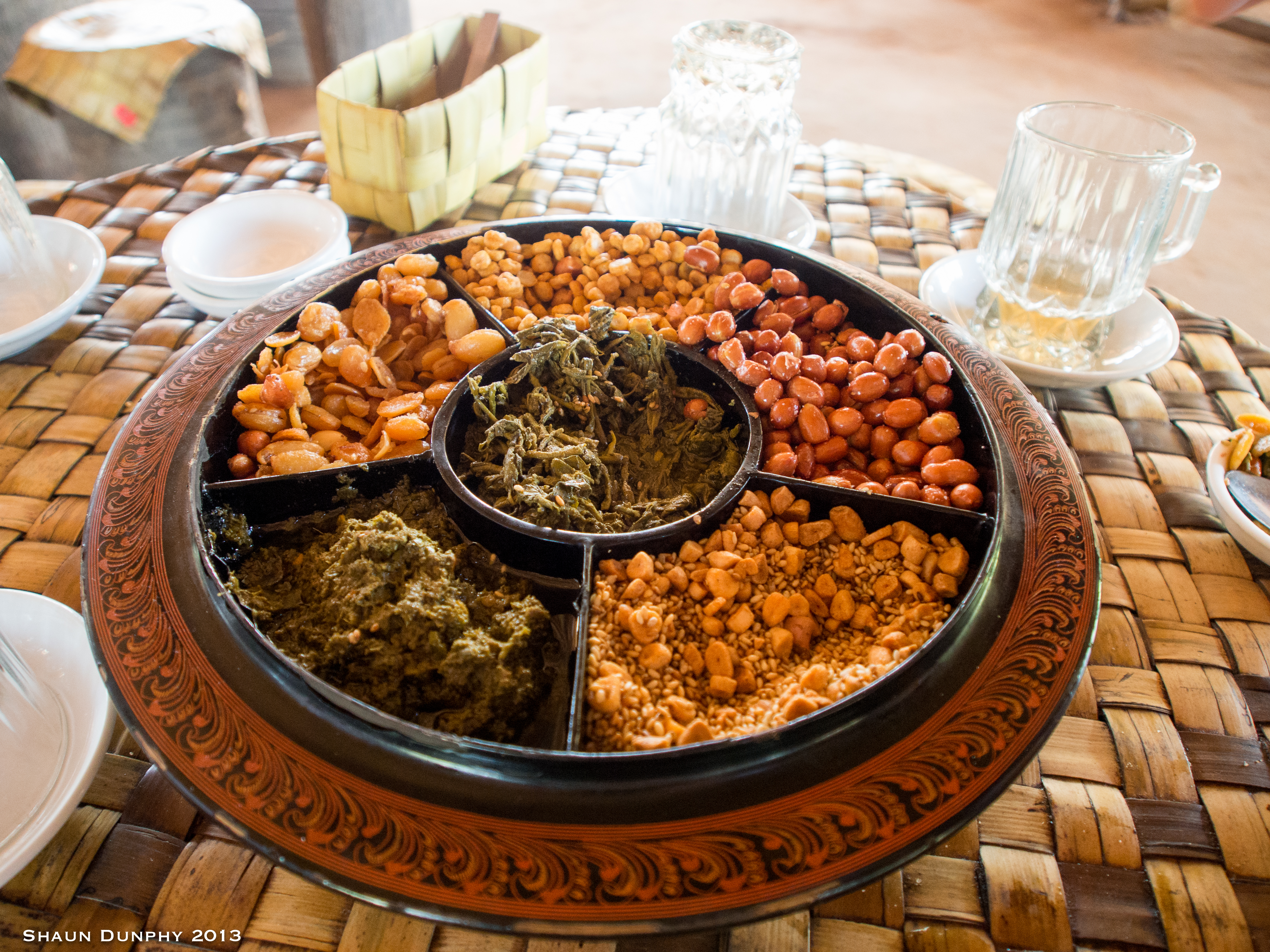
Pickled tea, called lahpet, is traditionally served in a lacquer tray called laphet ok.

Lacquer vessels, boxes and trays have a coiled or woven bamboo-strip base often mixed with horsehair. The thitsee may be mixed with ashes or sawdust to form a putty-like substance called thayo which can be sculpted. The object is coated layer upon layer with thitsee and thayo to make a smooth surface, polished and engraved with intricate designs, commonly using red, green and yellow colors on a red or black background. Shwezawa is a distinctive form in its use of gold leaf to fill in the designs on a black background.

Palace scenes, scenes from the Jataka tales, and the signs of the Burmese Zodiac are popular designs and some vessels may be encrusted with glass mosaic or semi-precious stones in gold relief. The objects are all handmade and the designs and engraving done free-hand. It may take three to four months to finish a small vessel but perhaps over a year for a larger piece. The finished product is a result of teamwork and not crafted by a single person.

==== Forms ====
The most distinctive vessel is probably a rice bowl on a stem with a spired lid for monks called hsun ok. Lahpet ok is a shallow dish with a lid and has a number of compartments for serving lahpet (pickled tea) with its various accompaniments. Stackable tiffin carriers fastened with a single handle or hsun gyaink are usually plain red or black. Daunglan are low tables for meals and may be simple broad based or have three curved feet in animal or floral designs with a lid. Water carafes or yeidagaung with a cup doubling as a lid, and vases are also among lacquerware still in use in many monasteries.

Various round boxes with lids, small and large, are known as yun-it including ones for paan called kun-it (Burmese: ကွမ်းအစ်; betel boxes). Yun titta are rectangular boxes for storing various articles including peisa or palm leaf manuscripts when they are called sadaik titta. Pedestal dishes or small trays with a stem with or without a lid are known as kalat for serving delicacies or offering flowers to royalty or the Buddha. Theatrical troupes and musicians have their lacquerware in costumes, masks, head-dresses, and musical instruments, some of them stored and carried in lacquer trunks. Boxes in the shape of a pumpkin or a bird such as the owl, which is believed to bring luck, or the hintha (Brahminy duck) are common too. Screens and small polygonal tables are also made for the tourist trade today.

==== Industry ====
Bagan is the major centre for the lacquerware industry where the handicraft has been established for nearly two centuries, and still practiced in the traditional manner. Here a government school of lacquerware was founded in the 1920s. Since plastics, porcelain and metal have superseded lacquer in most everyday utensils, it is today manufactured in large workshops mainly for tourists who come to see the ancient temples of Bagan. At the village of Kyaukka near Monywa in the Chindwin valley, however, sturdy lacquer utensils are still produced for everyday use mainly in plain black.

A decline in the number of visitors combined with the cost of resin, which has seen a 40-fold rise in 15 years, has led to the closure of over two-thirds of more than 200 lacquerware workshops in Bagan.

=== Vietnamese lacquer painting and lacquerware ===
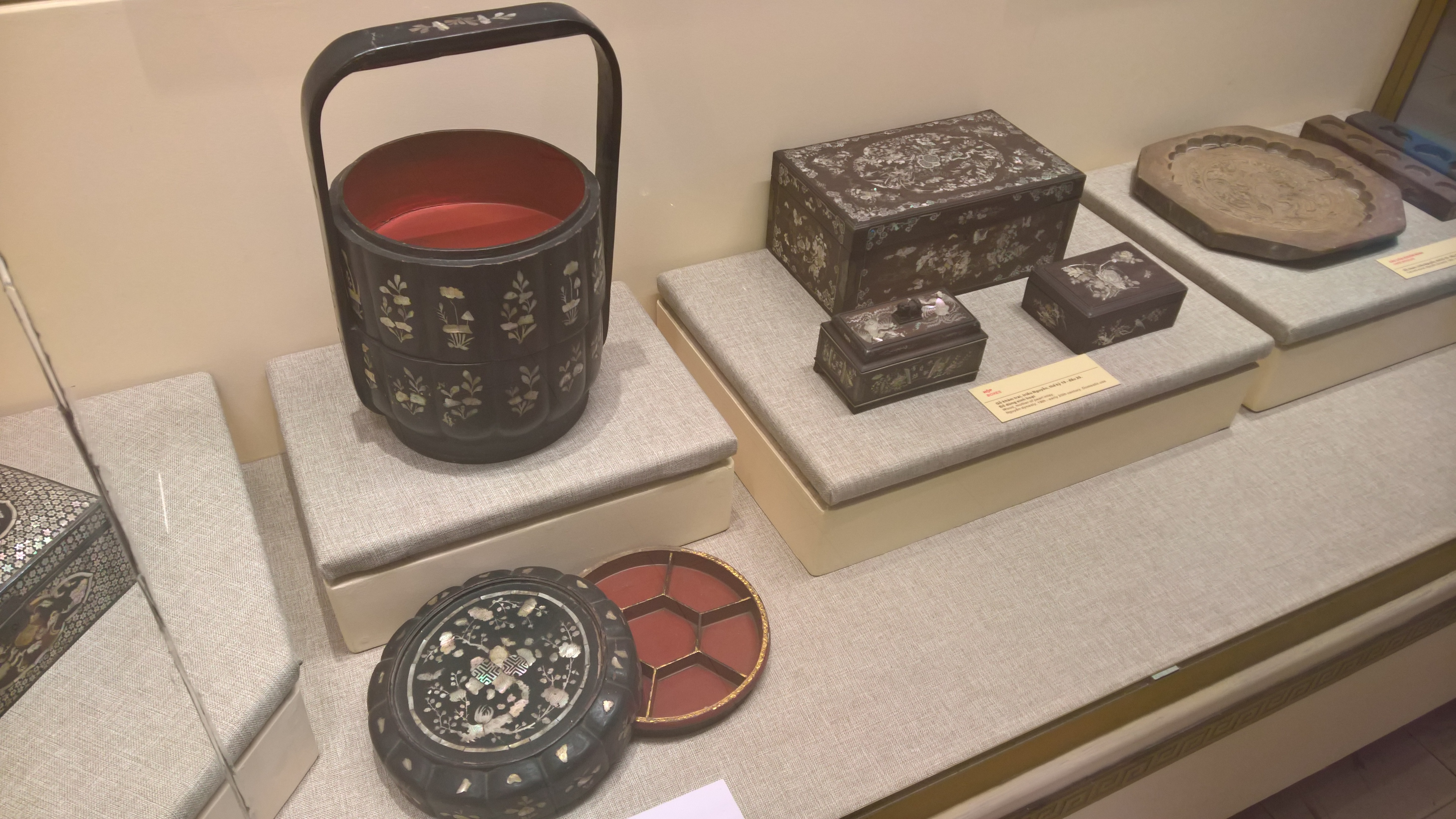
Lacquerware, Nguyễn dynasty, Vietnam

Sơn mài is a painting technique in Vietnam. It developed from the painters of the Hanoi EBAI in the 1930s and today is counted a national painting style with many famous painters.

In 1924 the Ecole des Beaux Arts was established in Hanoi. This institution was to be the birthplace of the revitalised art of lacquer painting. In 1934 the school opened its lacquer department and it was from here that well known contributors to the art including; Bui Trang Chuoc, Nguyen Van Binh, Nguyen Khang, Nguyen Duc Nung, Nguyen Tien Chung, and Pham Van Don would emerge. File:Hoangtichchu.jpg|Thầy Temple, a painting by Hoàng Tích Chù It was the first generation of Vietnamese students of the Indochina School of Fine Art during the 1930s, who elevated the craft of lacquer painting to a truly fine art. Less interested in decor than their craftsmen predecessors, it was also these men who would begin a series of artistic innovations from which craftsmen producing purely utilitarian or decorative pieces would also benefit.

Creating images with crushed eggshell, painting pigment over gold and tin foil and adding sand to lacquer were all techniques developed by those first students. The metallic color lacquerware for which Vietnamese craftsmen are rightly famous, was first developed by artists experimenting with many innovative techniques.

After the reunification, the art of lacquerware was slowly dying out in Vietnam. However, since the 1980s, the government now sees the artform as a vital cultural and economic practice and has encouraged the business community to invest in the craft. As a result, there has been a resurgence of lacquerware production and a proliferation of lacquerware products produced in Vietnam.

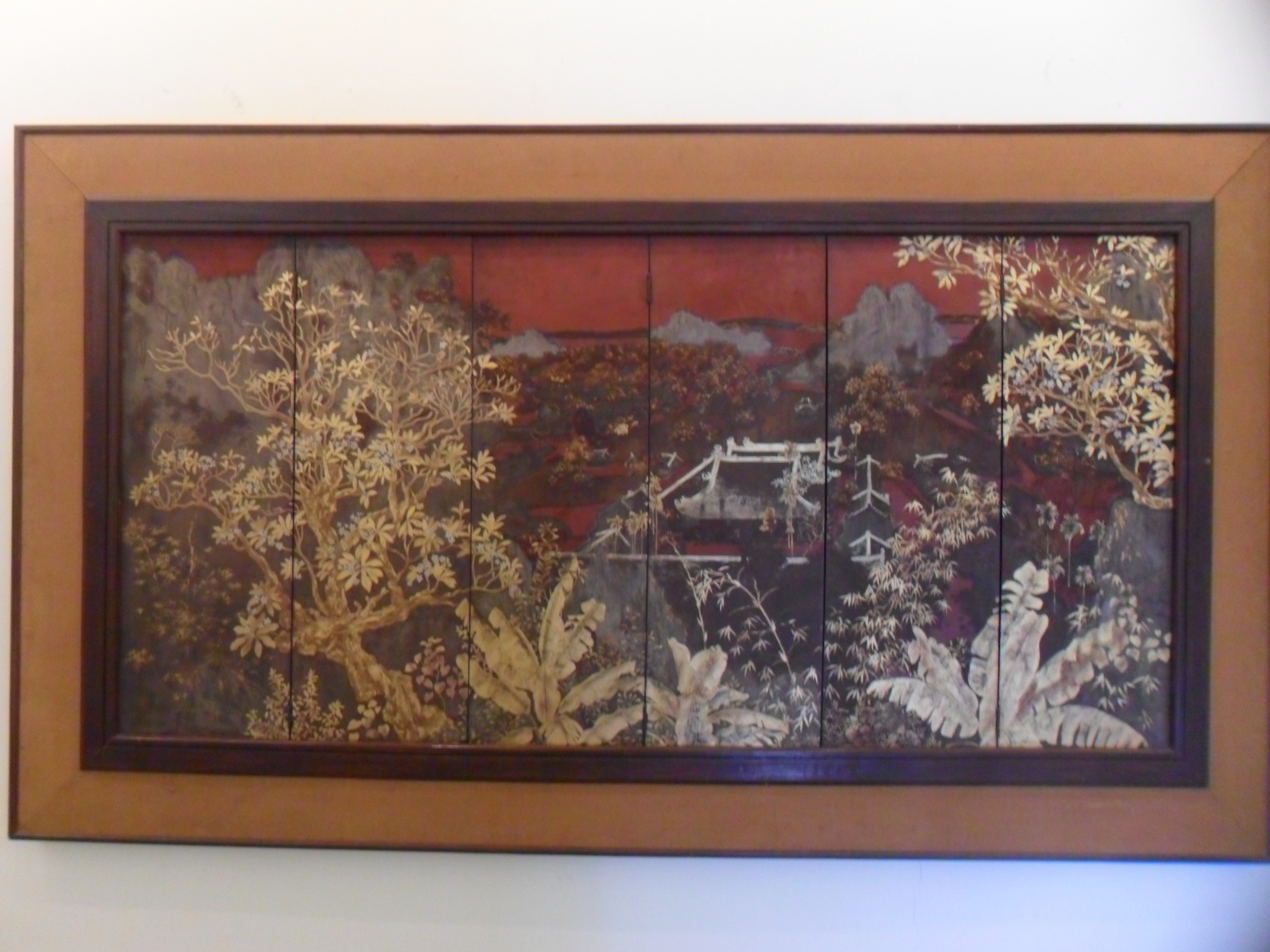
Thầy Temple, a painting by Hoàng Tích Chù

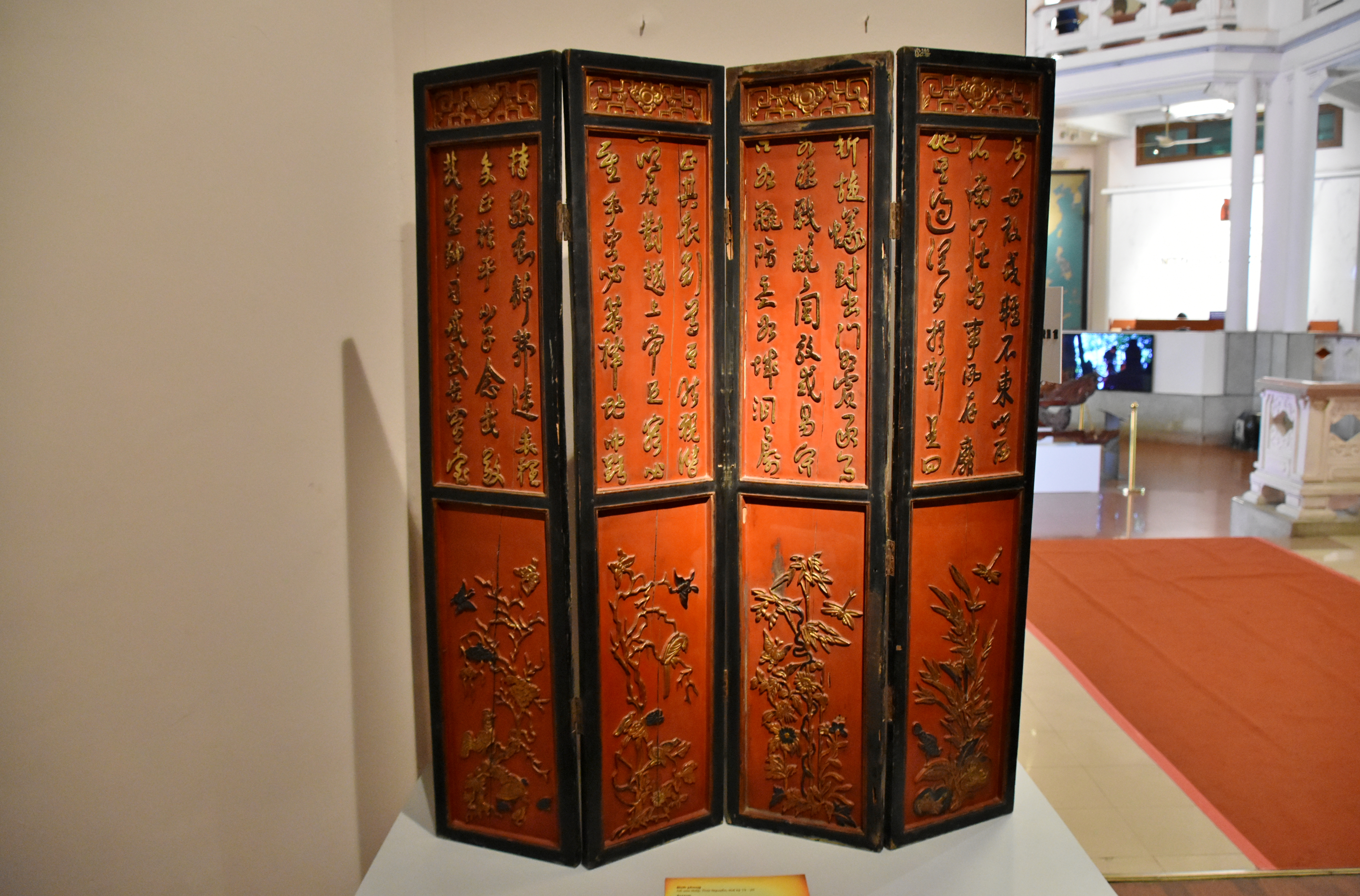
A folding screen using Vietnamese lacquer

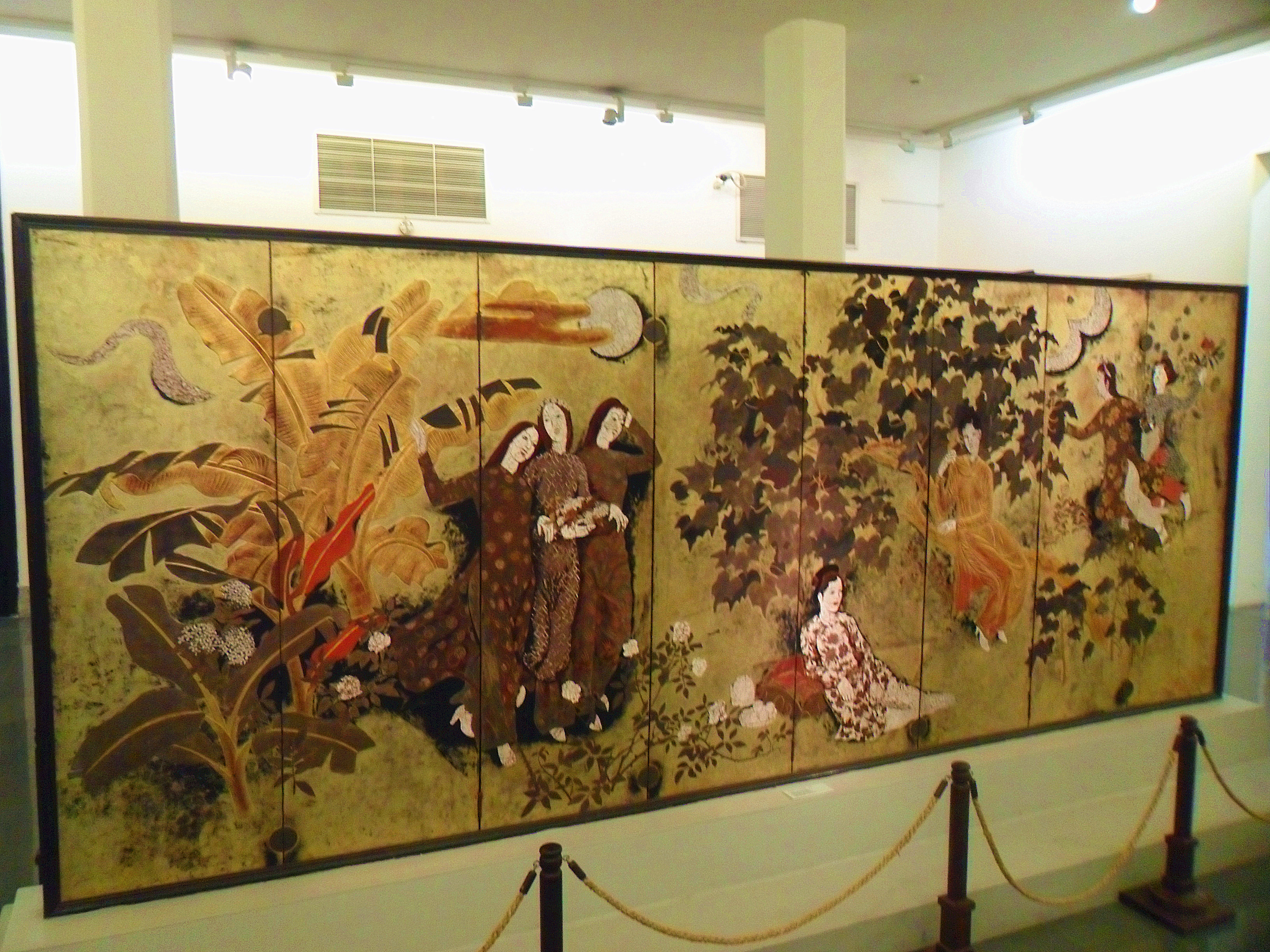
A 20th century lacquered folding screen of Nguyen Gia Tri

Vietnamese landscape, lacquer paintings, 1955.

== South Asia ==
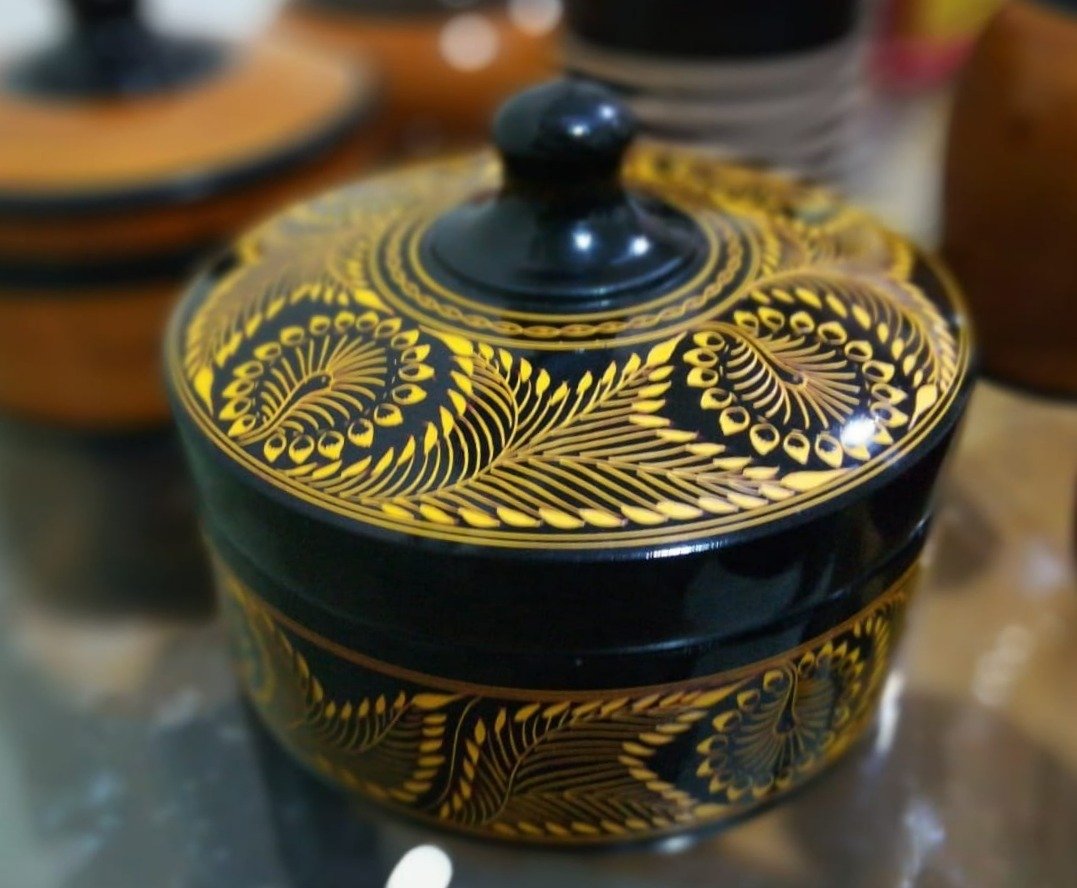
Laksha is a traditional form of lacquerware from Sri Lanka which is made from shellac derived from Lac.

In India, the insect lac or shellac was used since ancient times. Shellac is the secretion of the lac bug (Tachardia lacca Kerr. or Laccifer lacca). It is used for wood finish, lacquerware, skin cosmetic, ornaments, dye for textiles, production of different grades of shellac for surface coating. The Atharvaveda text 1200 BCE – 1000 BCE devotes a chapter to 'lākshā' and its various uses.

== Americas ==
=== Barniz de Pasto technique ===
Barniz de Pasto (es) is a lacquer-like varnish technique originating in the Pre-Columbian era that is a specialty of Pasto, Colombia. It is made by chewing the resin of the Andean mopa-mopa shrub (Elaeagia pastoensis) into thin layers, and then painting it and applying it to a wood, metal, clay or glass surface using heated stones. Historically, the technique was applied to wooden keros, drinking vessels.

=== Mexican lacquerware ===
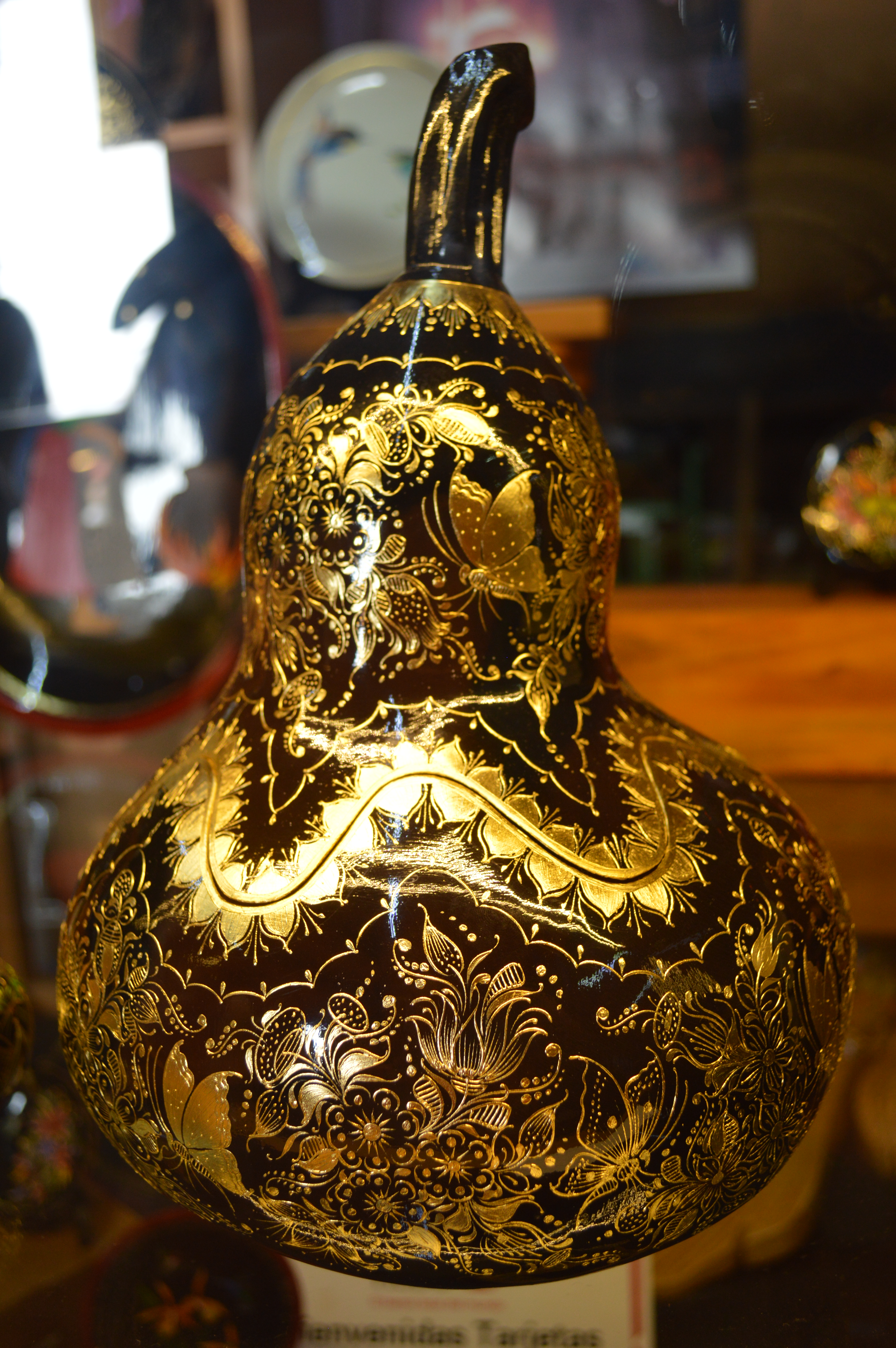
A decorative lacquered gourd with gold details at a shop in Pátzcuaro, Michoacán

Known in Mexican Spanish as laca or maque (from Japanese maki-e), Mexican lacquer has independent origins from Asian lacquer. In the pre-Hispanic period, a substance from the larvae of aje scale insects and/or oil from the chia seed were mixed with powdered minerals to create protective coatings and decorative designs. During this period, the process was almost always applied to dried gourds, especially to make the cups that Mesoamerican nobility drank chocolate from.

After the Conquest, the Spanish had indigenous craftsmen apply the technique to European style furniture and other items, changing the decorative motifs and color schemes, but the process and materials remained mostly the same. Asian lacquerware and artisans brought by the Nao de China also had an influence on the style and motifs of colonial Mexican lacquerware. Today, workshops creating lacquerware are limited to Olinalá, Temalacatzingo and Acapetlahuaya in the state of Guerrero, Uruapan and Pátzcuaro in Michoacán and Chiapa de Corzo in Chiapas. The most popular modern lacquerware are small boxes, sometimes known as cajitas de Olinalá.

== See also ==
- Chinese lacquerware table
- Japanning
- Lacquer painting
