= Hirameji =

Lacquerware technique

Hirameji (Japanese: “flat dust base”) is a Japanese lacquerware technique using flakes of gold or silver. Hirmeji is believed to have been from an earlier, Heian period technique known as "heijin".
