= Korean architecture =

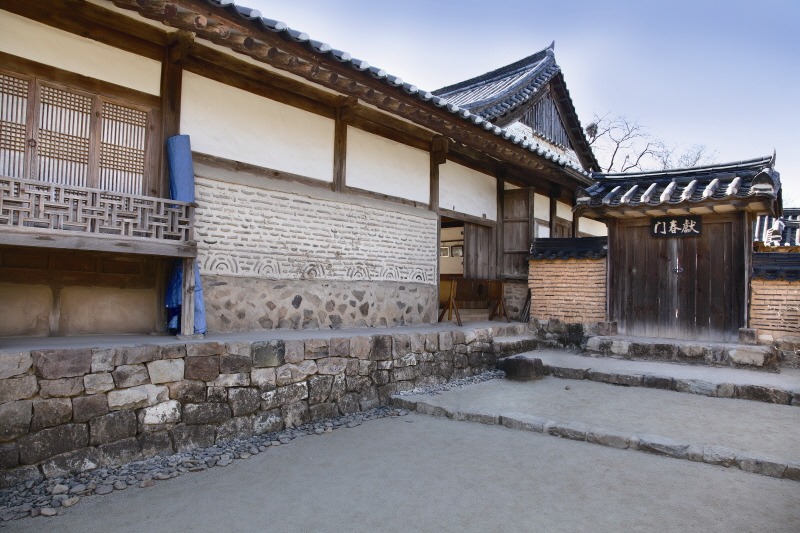
The east wing sarangchae

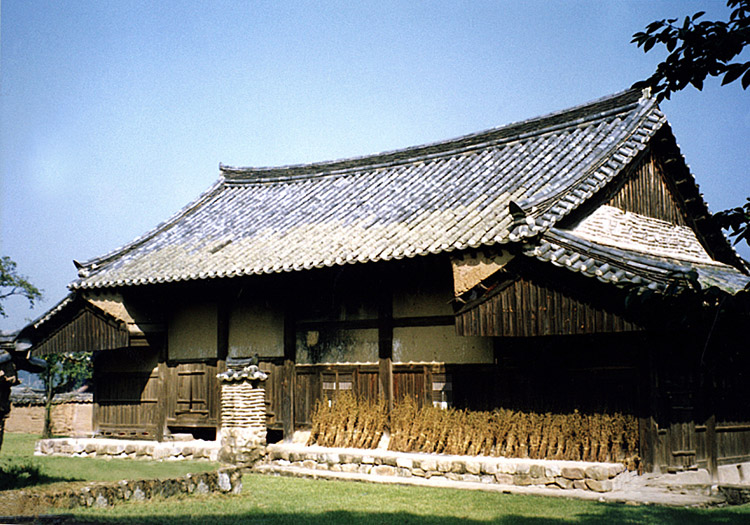
The rear side of the anchae

A yangban manor in the rural area of Gyeongsang Province.

Korean architecture (Korean: 한국건축) refers to an architectural style that developed over centuries in Korea. Throughout the history of Korea, various kingdoms and royal dynasties have developed a unique style of architecture with influences from Buddhism and Korean Confucianism. Traditional Korean architecture can be mostly recognized by its sloping roofs.

As in the case of other Korean arts, Korean architecture is distinguished by its naturalistic tendencies, simplicity, economy of shape, and avoidance of extremes.

== General characteristics ==
In Korean architecture, buildings are structured vertically and horizontally. A construction usually rises from a stone subfoundation to a curved roof covered with tiles, held by a console structure and supported on posts; walls are made of earth (adobe) or are sometimes totally composed of movable wooden doors. Architecture is built according to the kan unit, the distance between two posts (about 3.7 meters), and is designed so that there is always a transitional space between the "inside" and the "outside."

The console, or bracket structure, is a specific architectonic element that has been designed in various ways through time. If the simple bracket system was already in use under the Goguryeo kingdom (37 BC – 668 AD)—in palaces in Pyongyang, for instance—a curved version, with brackets placed only on the column heads of the building, was elaborated during the early Goryeo dynasty (918–1392). The Amita Hall of the Buseok temple in Yeongju is a good example. Later on (from the mid-Goryeo period to the early Joseon period), a multiple-bracket system, or an inter-columnar-bracket set system, was developed under the ancient Han dynasty in China influence during the Mongolian Yuan dynasty (1279–1368). In this system, the consoles were also placed on the transverse horizontal beams. Seoul's Namdaemun Gate Namdaemun, Korea's first national treasure, is perhaps the most symbolic example of this type of structure.

In the mid-Joseon period, the winglike bracket form appeared (an example is the Yongnyongjon Hall of Jongmyo, Seoul), which, according to some authors, better suited the peninsula's poor economic situation that resulted from repetitive invasions. Only in buildings of importance like palaces or sometimes temples (Tongdosa, for instance) were the multicluster brackets still used. Korean Confucianism also led to more sober and simple solutions.

== Historical architecture ==
=== Prehistoric architecture ===
In the Paleolithic the first inhabitants of the Korean peninsula used caves, rockshelters, and portable shelters. The remains of a portable shelter dating to c. 30,000 BC were excavated at the Seokjang-ri site in South Chungcheong Province. The earliest examples of pit-house architecture are from the Jeulmun Pottery Period. Early pit-houses contained basic features such as hearths, storage pits, and space for working and sleeping.

Log houses were built by laying logs horizontally one on top of one another. The interstices between the logs were filled with clay to keep the wind out. Similar houses are still found in mountainous areas those in like Gangwon Province.

Elevated houses, which probably originated in the southern regions, are believed to have first been built as storage houses to store grains out of the reach of animals and to keep them cool. This style still survives in the two-story pavilions and lookout stands erected in melon patches and orchards around the countryside.

In the Mumun period buildings were pit dwellings with walls of wattle-and-daub and thatched roofs. Raised-floor architecture first appeared in the Korean peninsula in the Middle Mumun, c. 850–550 BC.

Megaliths, sometimes called dolmens, are the burials of important and prestigious persons of the Mumun Pottery Period (1500–300 BC). They have been found in great numbers and along with stone-cist burials, megaliths and are the main examples of mortuary architecture in the Mumun. There are three types of megaliths: (1) the southern type, which is low and often a simple slab with supporting stones, (2) the northern type, which is larger and shaped much like a table, and (3) the capstone type, which has a capstone with no supporting stones. The distribution of the dolmens would imply some relation to other global megalithic cultures.

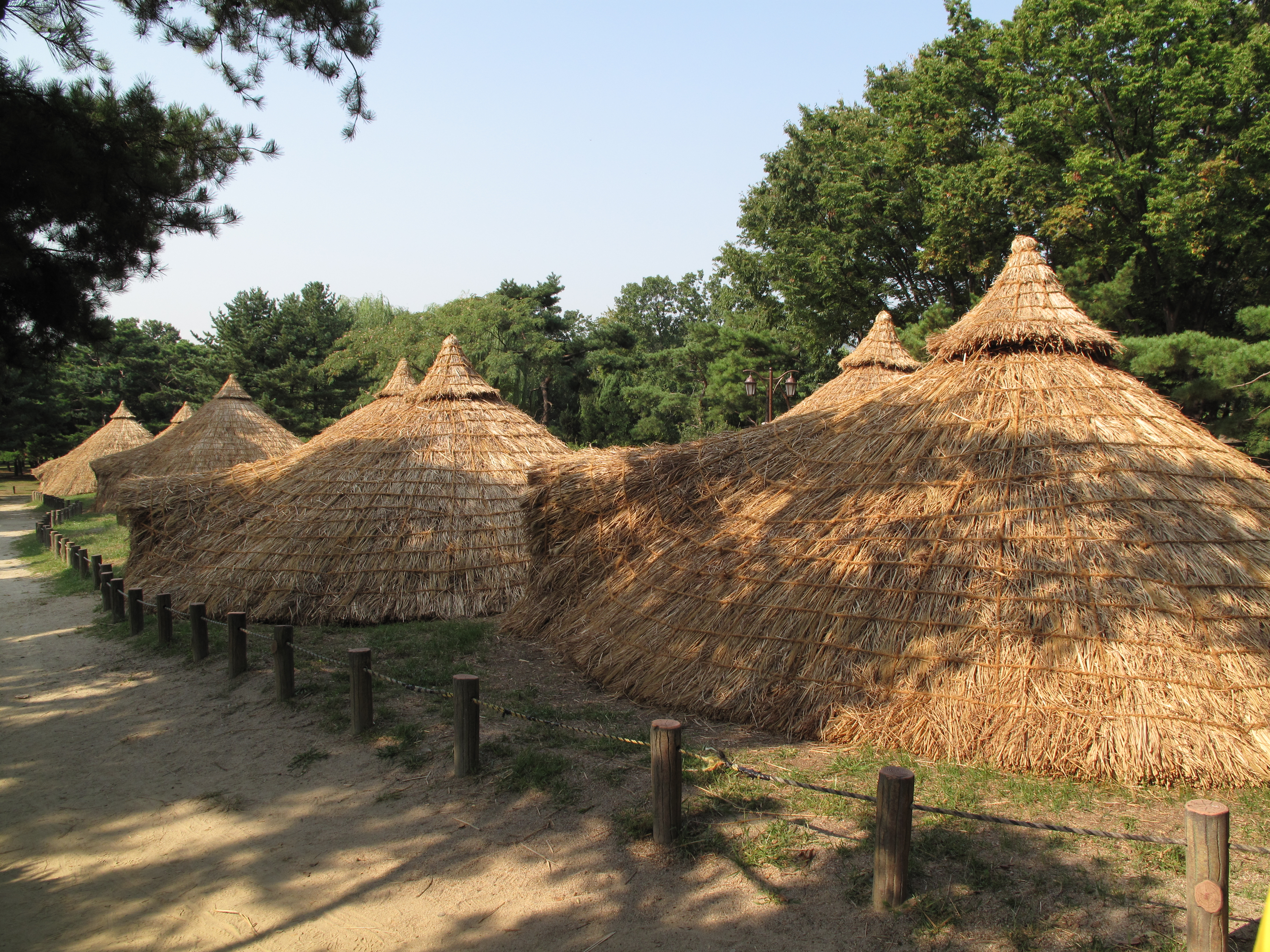
Reconstructed Neolithic-period huts in Amsa-dong, Gangdong District, Seoul

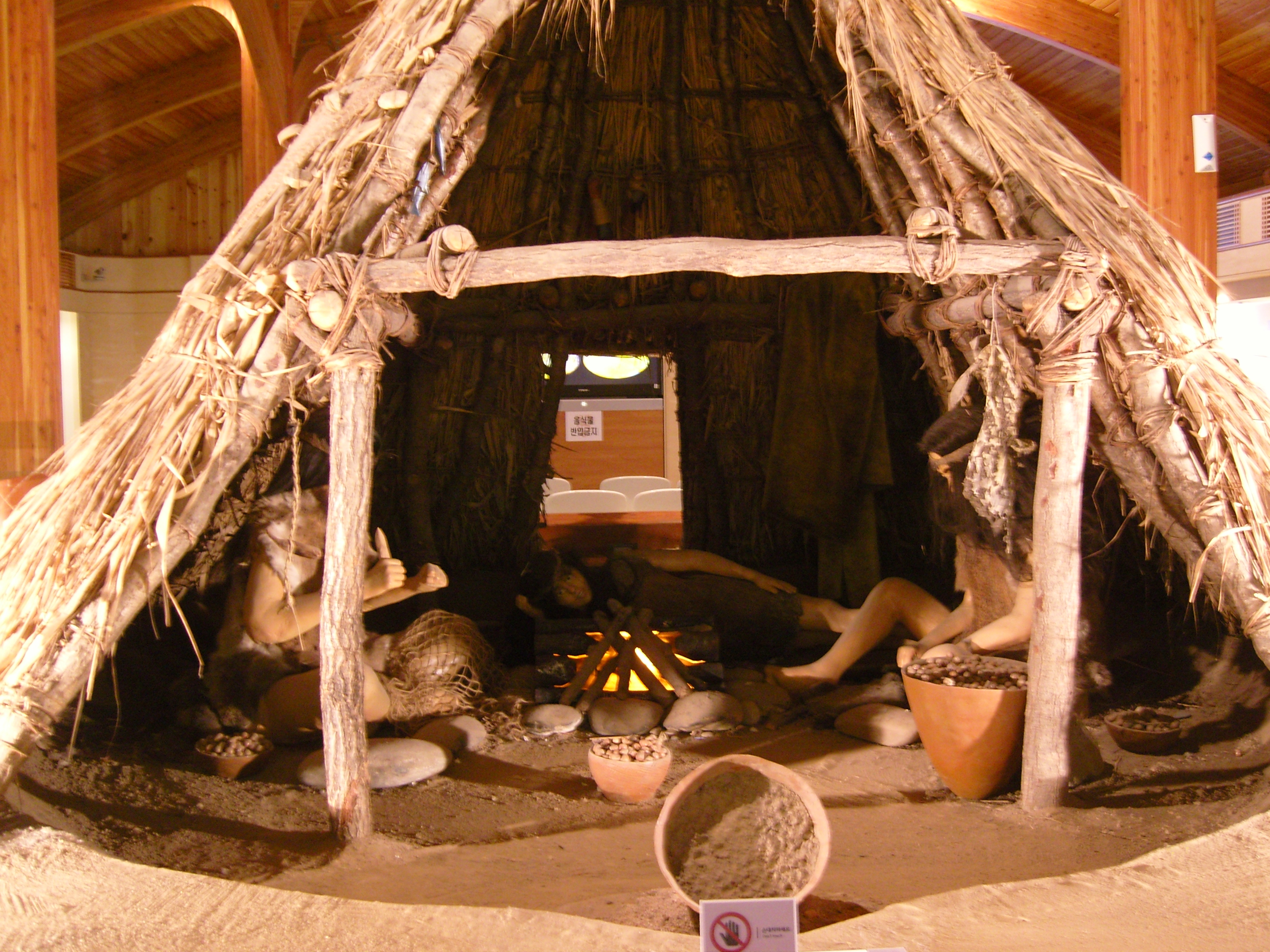
Model

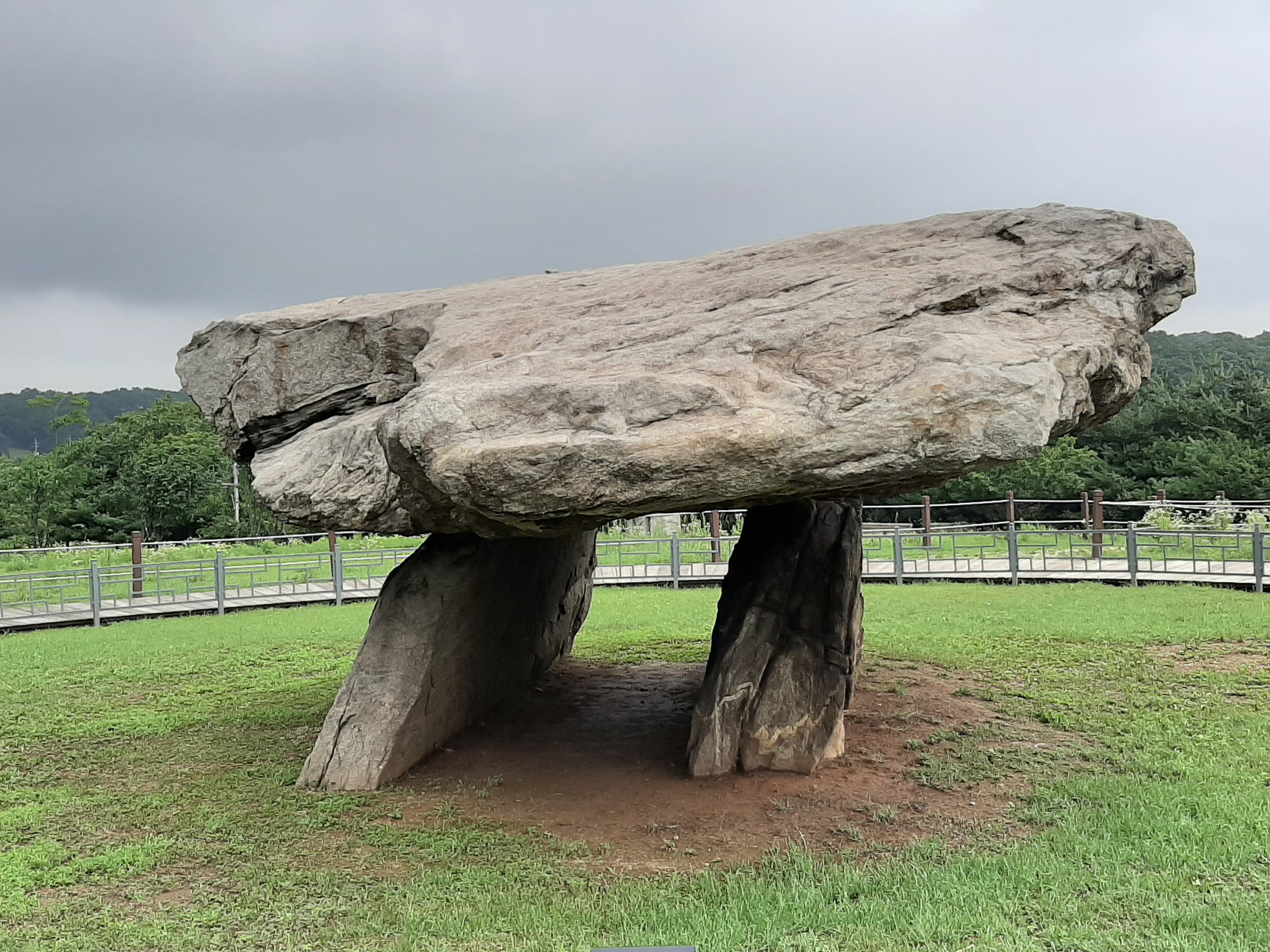
Dolmen at Ganghwa Island

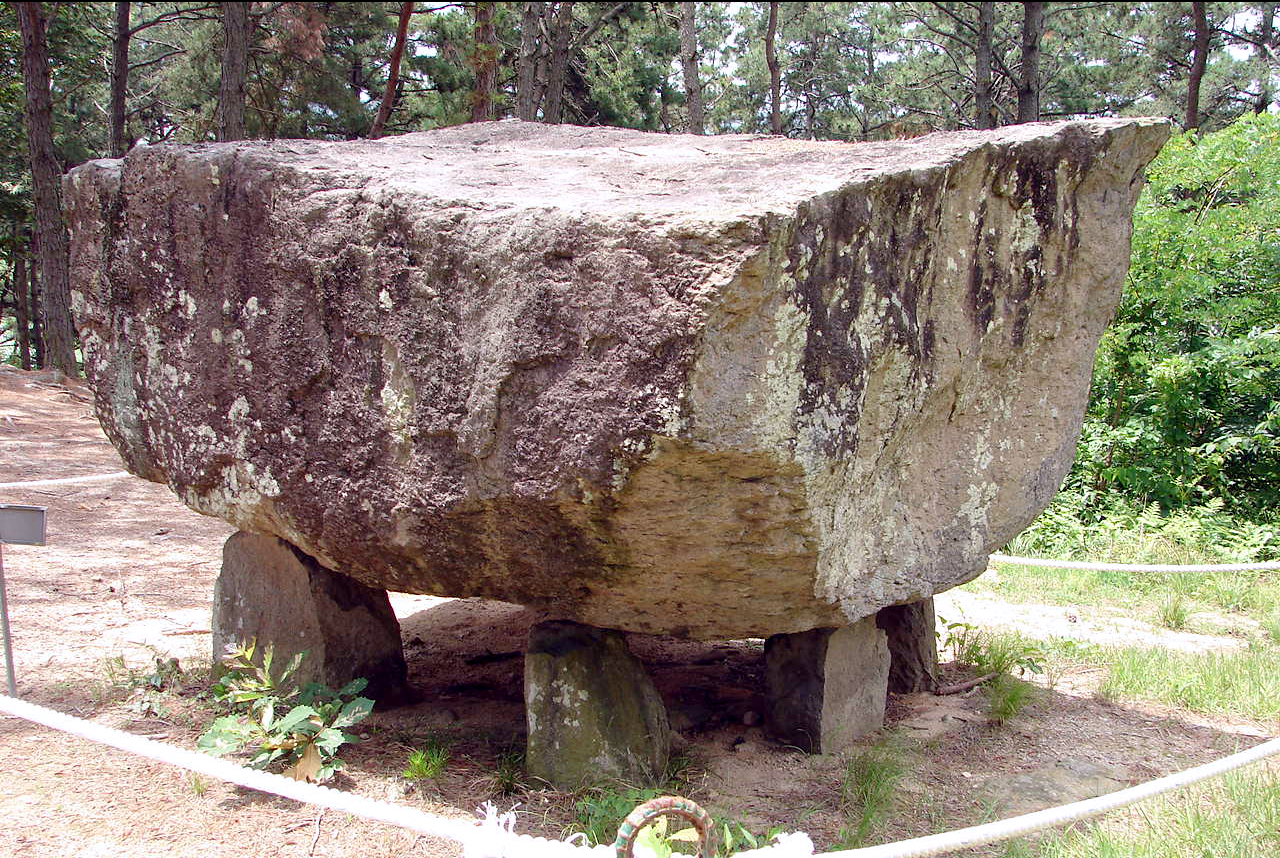
Gochang Dolmen, a UNESCO World Heritage Site.

=== Proto–Three Kingdoms period (c. 1st-2nd century BC to 2nd-3rd century AD) ===
It is a subdivision of what is traditionally called Korea's Three Kingdoms Period and covers the first three centuries of the Common Era. Archaeological evidence of ondol (온돌), the Korean floor panel heating system, was found in the architectural remains of early Protohistoric period.

According to Chinese text Sanguo Zhi, it recorded the existence of three types of prehistoric dwellings in Korea: pit houses, log houses and elevated houses. Only the remains of pit houses have been identified, however. Pit houses consisted of a 20–150 cm deep pit and a superstructure of grass and clay supported by a tripod-like frame made of timber to provide protection from the wind and rain. Pit houses of the Neolithic period had circular or oval pits about 5–6 meters in diameter with a hearth at the center. Most of the early ones were located on hills. As these dwellings moved down nearer to rivers, the pits became rectangular in shape as well as larger, with two separated hearths. In 108 BC, the Chinese commanderies was established after the destruction of Gojoseon. Official buildings of this period were built of wood and brick and roofed with tiles having the features of Chinese construction.

=== Three Kingdoms period (c. 1st century BC-668) ===
==== Common architecture ====
In the Three Kingdoms Period, some people lived in pit-houses while others lived in raised-floor buildings. For example, the Hanseong (한성; 漢城, an eastern part of Seoul and western part of Hanam in Gyeonggi Province) Baekje settlement of Seongdong-ri in Gyeonggi Province contained only pit-houses, while the Silla settlement of Siji-dong in Greater Daegu contained only raised-floor architecture.

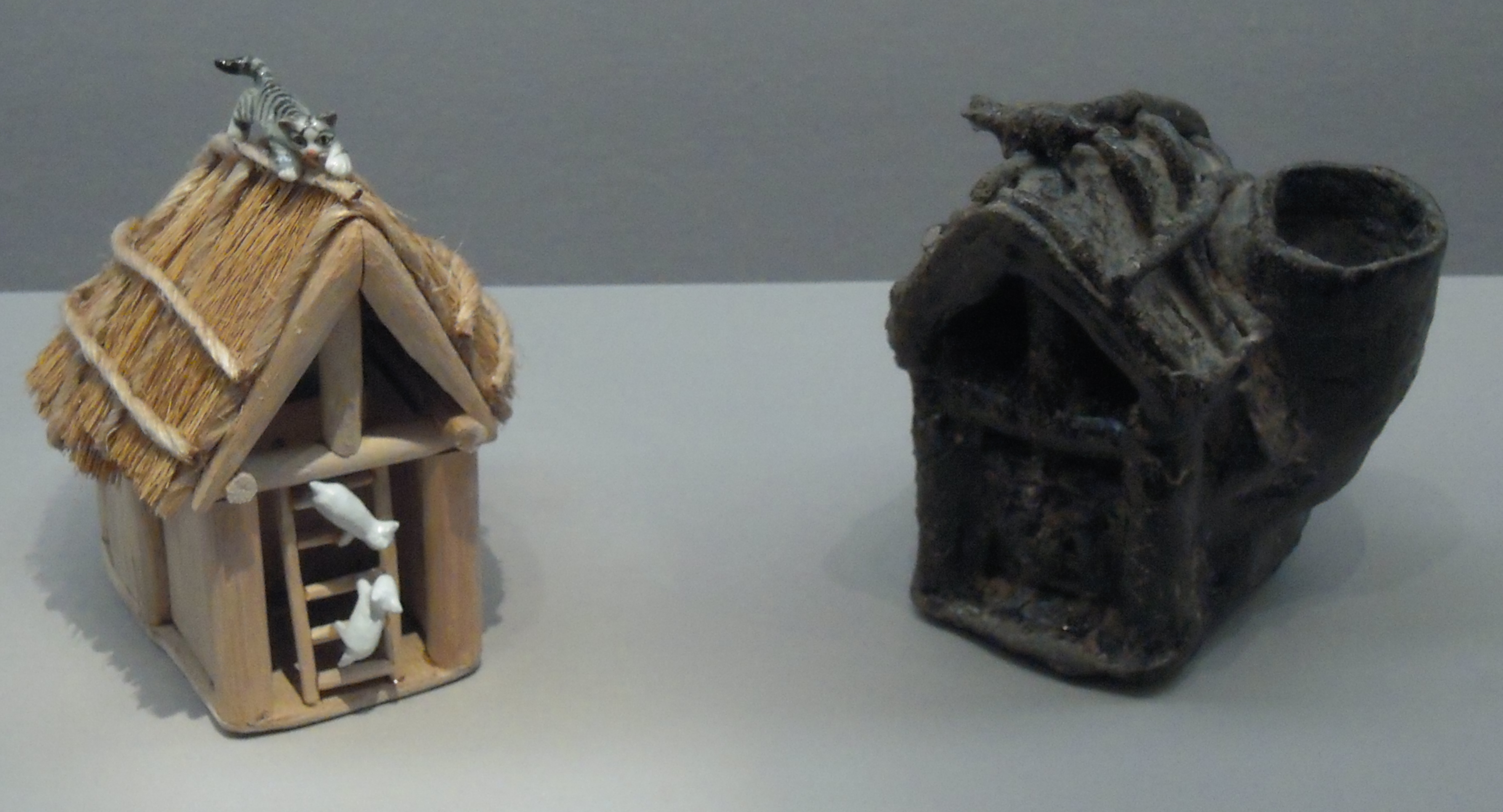
Pottery shaped in the form of a house from Gaya.

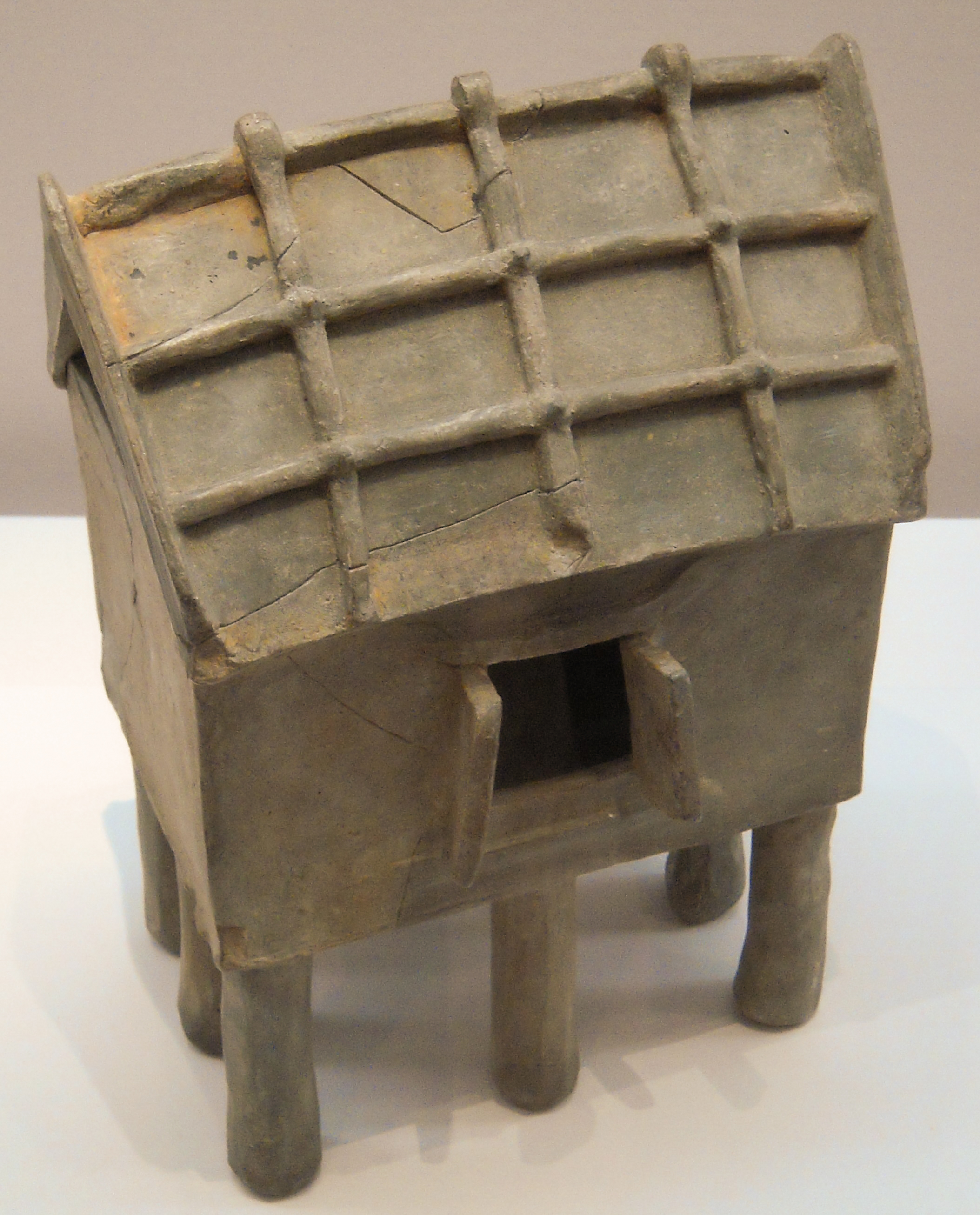
Pottery shaped in the form of a house from Gaya.

==== Fortress architecture ====
Goguryeo, the largest kingdom among the Three Kingdoms of Korea, is renowned for its mountain fortresses built horizontally and vertically along the incline of slopes. One of the well-preserved Goguryeo fortresses is Baekam fortress (白巖城) constructed before 6th century in present-day South-West Manchuria. A Chinese historian noted, "The Goguryeo people like to build their palaces well." Patterned tiles and ornate bracket systems were already in use in many palaces in Pyongyang, the capital, and other town-fortresses in what now is Manchuria.

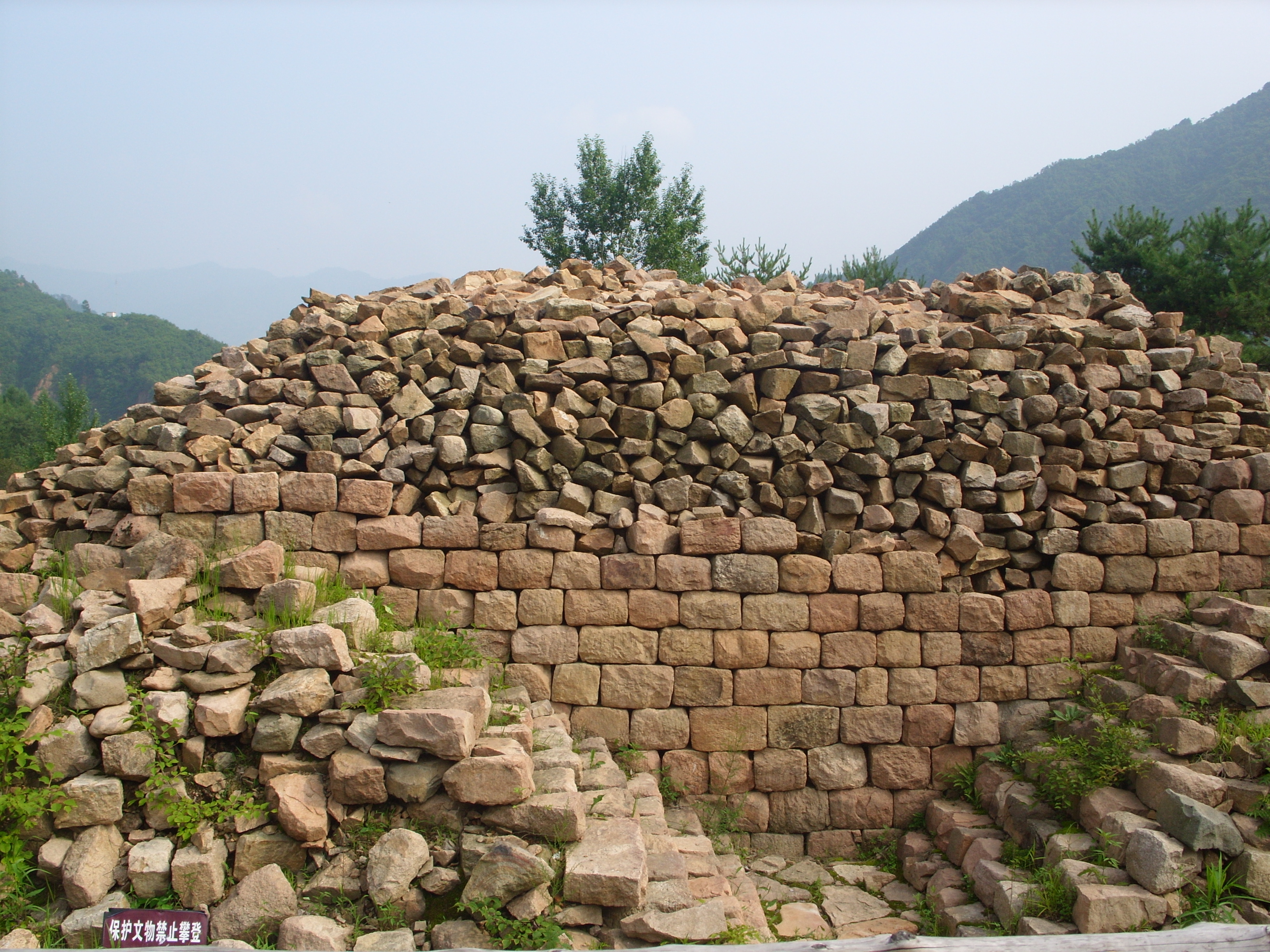
Ruins of Hwando Mountain Fortress, a major Goguryeo fortification, Ji'an, China. A UNESCO World Heritage Site dated to c. 5th century.

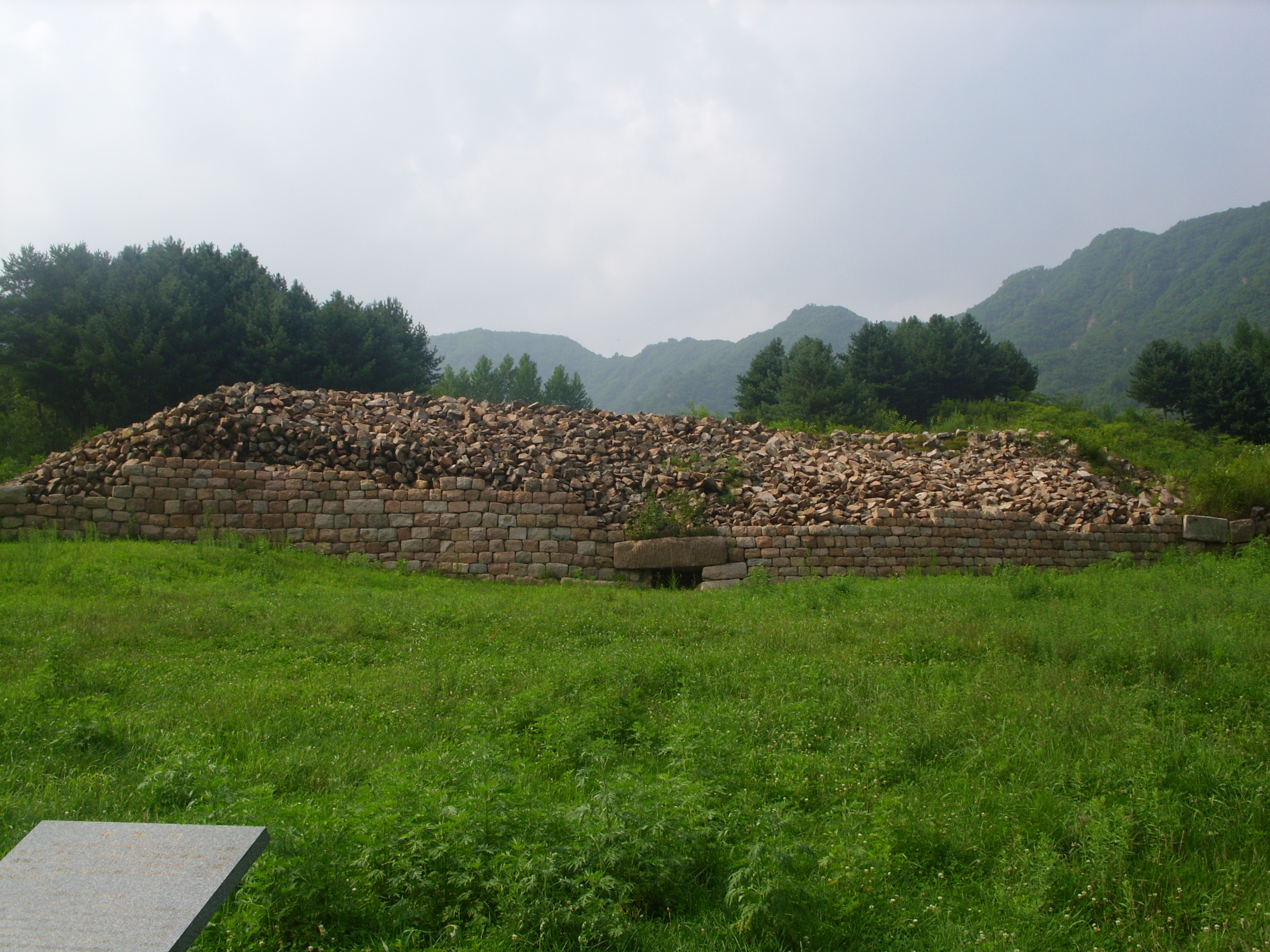
Hwando Mountain Fortress ruins.

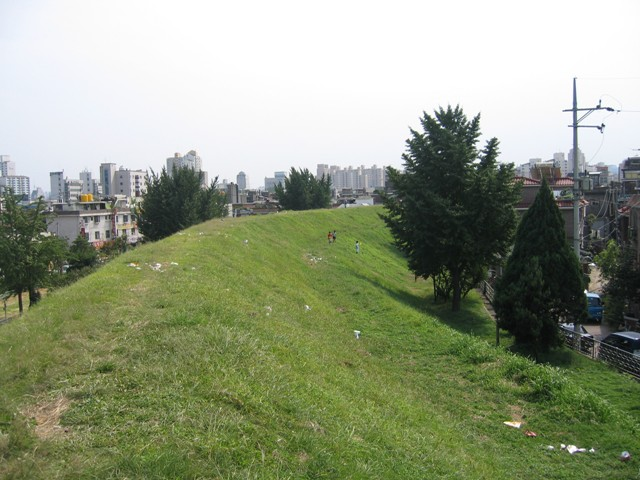
The remains of a major rammed earth fortress of the early Baekje kingdom, c. 3rd or 4th century. Seoul, South Korea.

==== Religious architecture ====
The Mireuksaji Stone Pagoda, built in the Baekje Kingdom era

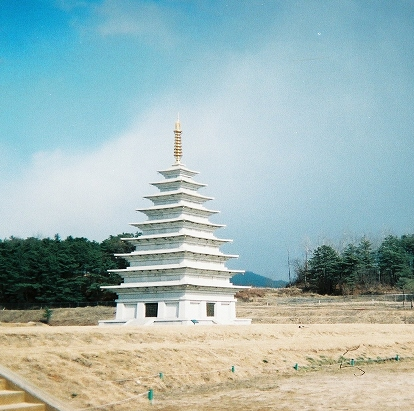
Reconstruction of the eastern stone pagoda of Mireuksa Temple.

The temple Mireuksa was established in 602 by King Mu and is located modern Iksan, South Korea.

The construction of Buddhist temples was undertaken after Buddhism was introduced in Korean Goguryeo in 372 by way of northern China. A series of excavations in 1936–1938 unearthed the sites of several major temples near Pyongyang, including those in Cheongam-ri, Wono-ri and Sango-ri. The excavations disclosed that the temples were built in a Goguryeo style known as "three Halls-one Pagoda," with each hall in the east, west and north, and an entrance gate in the south. In most cases, the central pagodas had an octagonal plan. Palace buildings appear to have been arranged in this way as well.

Baekje was founded in 18 BC and its territory included the west coast of the ancient Korea. After the fall of Nangnang County under the Han dynasty in China, Korean Baekje established friendships with China and Japan. Great temples were built during this time. The earliest stone pagoda of the Mireuksa Temple in Iksan county is of particular interest because it shows the transitional features from a wooden pagoda to a stone one. Baekje assimilated diverse influences and expressed its derivation from Chinese models. Later, important elements of the architectural style of Baekje were adopted by Japan.

Baekje was heavily influenced by Goguryeo because the first King Onjo of Baekje was a son of the Goguryeo's first king Go Ju-mong as well as by southern China. As it expanded southward, moving its capital to Ungjin (current Gongju) in 475 and to Sabi (current Buyeo) in 538, its arts became richer and more refined than that of Goguryeo. Also characteristic of Baekje architecture is its use of curvilinear designs. Though no Baekje buildings are extant - in fact, no wooden structure of any of the Three Kingdoms now remains - it is possible to deduce from Horyuji temple in Japan, which Baekje architects and technicians helped to build, that Baekje's architecture came into full bloom after the introduction of Buddhism in 384. What remains in the building sites, patterned tiles and other relics, as well as the stone pagodas that have survived the ravages of time, testifies to the highly developed culture of Baekje.

The site of Mireuksa temple, the largest in Baekje, was excavated in 1980 at Iksan of Jeollabuk-do Province. The excavation disclosed many hitherto unknown facts about Baekje architecture. A stone pagoda at Mireuksa temple is one of two extant Baekje pagodas. It is also the largest as well as being the oldest of all Korean pagodas. Mireuksa temple had an unusual arrangement of three pagodas erected in a straight line going from east to west, each with a hall to its north. Each pagoda and hall appear to have been surrounded by covered corridors, giving the appearance of three separate temples of a style called "one Hall-one Pagoda." The pagoda at the center was found to have been made of wood, while the other two were made of stone. The sites of a large main hall and a middle gate were unearthed to the north and south of the wooden pagoda.

When the site of Jeongnimsa temple was excavated in 1982, which had also been the site of the other existing Baekje pagoda, the remains of a main hall and a lecture hall arranged on the main axis one behind the other were unearthed to the north of the pagoda. The remains of a middle gate, a main gate and a pond arranged on the main axis one in front of the other were also discovered to its south. It was found that the temple was surrounded by corridors from the middle gate to the lecture hall. This "one Pagoda" style was typical of Baekje, as the excavations of the temple site in Gunsu-ri and in Gumgangsa temple in Buyeo in 1964. The building sites of Gumgangsa temple, however, were arranged on the main axis going from east to west rather than from north to south.

Early Buddhism in Silla developed under the influence of Goguryeo. Some monks from Goguryeo came to Silla and preached among the people, making a few converts.

Silla was the last of the three kingdoms to develop into a full-fledged kingdom. Buddhist temples were built in Silla. One of the well known examples of Silla architecture is Cheomseongdae, said to be the first stone observatory in Asia. It was built during the reign of Queen Seondeok (632–646). The structure is known for its unique and elegant form.

One of the earliest Silla temples, Hwangnyongsa temple was systematically excavated and studied in 1976, and found to have been of considerable magnitude. It stood in a square walled area, the longest side of which was 288 meters. The area enclosed by corridors alone was about 19,040 square meters. The Samguk sagi records that there was a nine-story wooden pagoda built here in 645 that was about 80 meters high by today's scale. A large image of Sakyamuni Buddha is also recorded to have been enshrined in the main hall with the stone pedestal still remaining. Constructed in the middle of the 6th century, Hwangnyongsa temple flourished for more than 680 years during which time the halls were rearranged many times. In its prime, immediately before Silla's unification of the peninsula in 668, it was arranged in the "three Halls-one Pagoda" style, quite unlike the "one Hall-one Pagoda" style of Baekje's Mireuksa temple.

Another major Silla temple was Bunhwangsa, on the site of which still stands three stories of what is recorded to have been a nine-story pagoda. As the remains show, the pagoda was made of stones cut to look like bricks. A set of stone flagpole pillars in addition to other stone relics also remain.

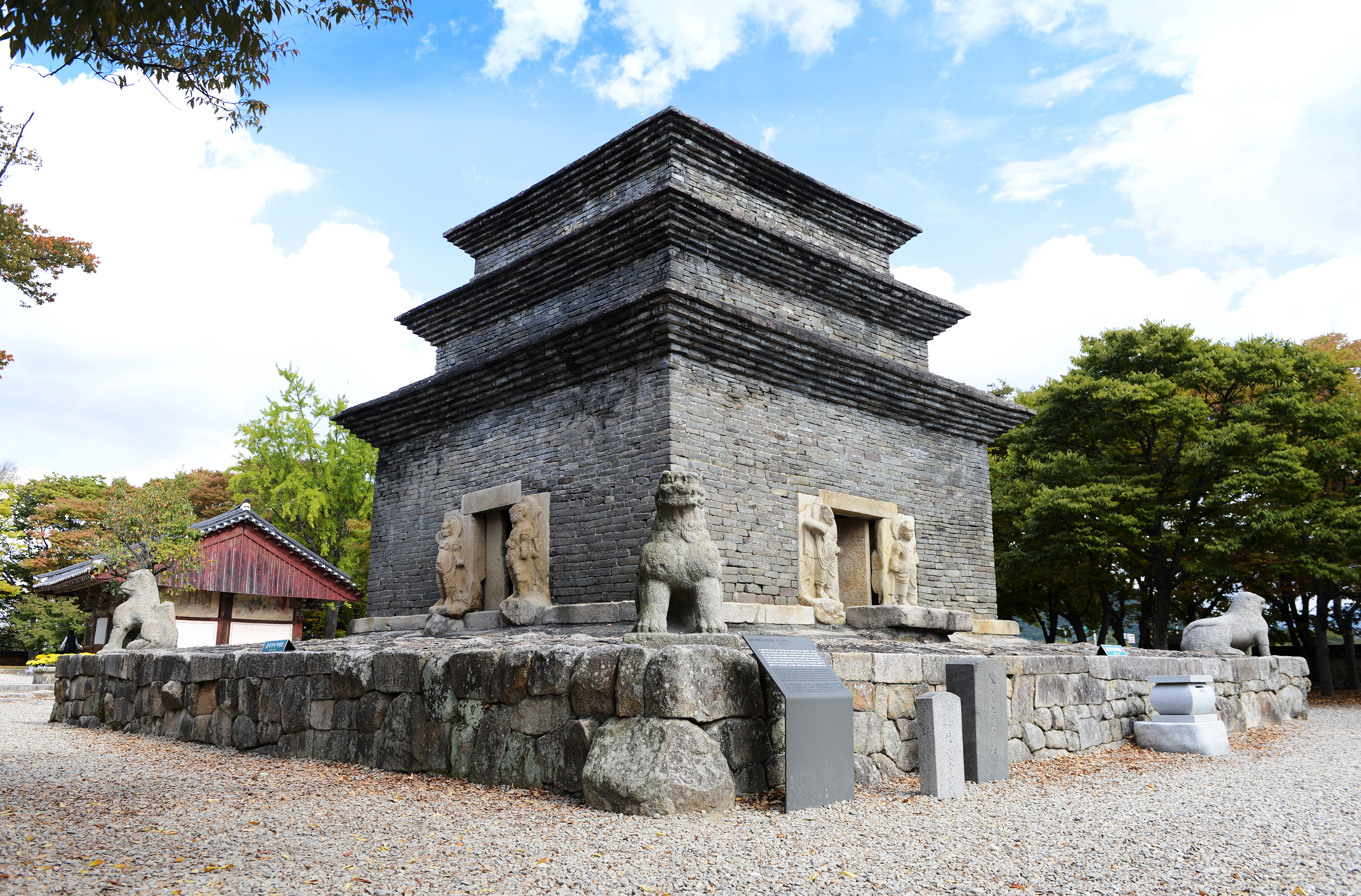
Pagoda of Bunhwang Temple. It is thought this pagoda once stood seven or nine stories based on historical records.

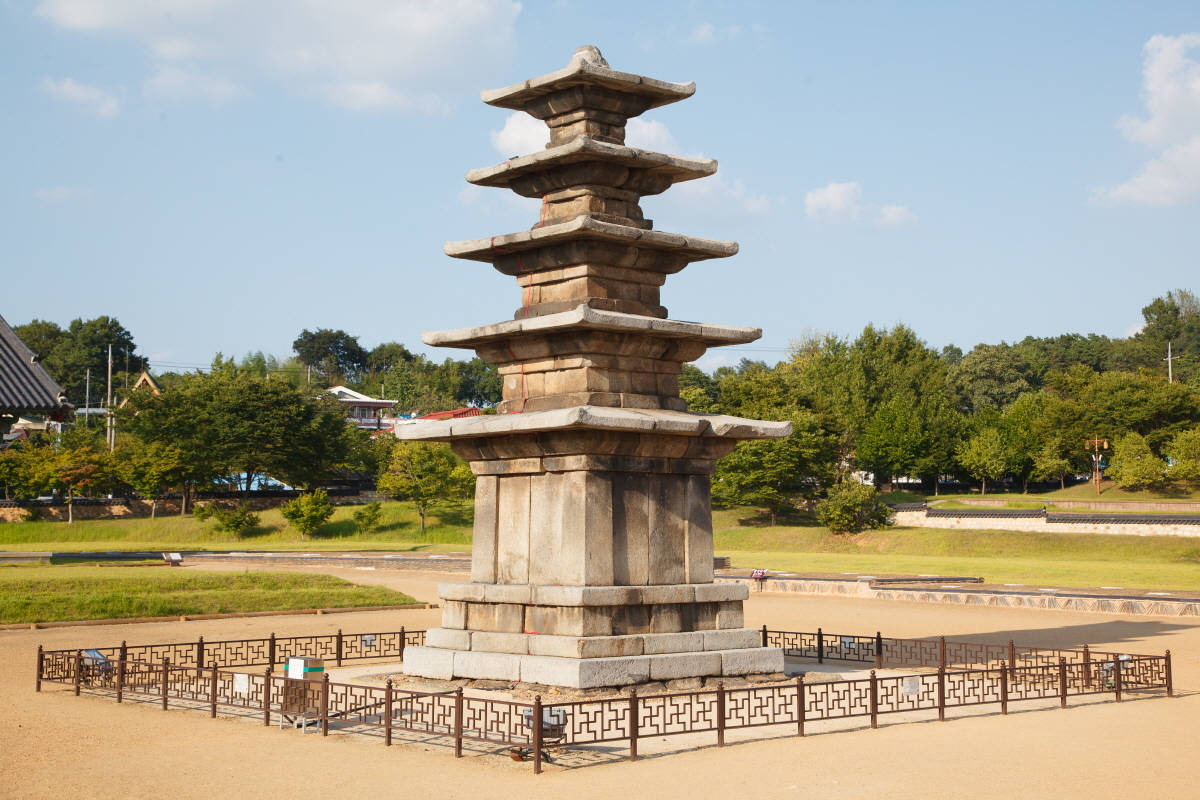
Five-story Stone Pagoda at Jeongnimsa Temple Site, one of the oldest surviving pagodas in Korea. Baekje period, Buyeo, South Korea.

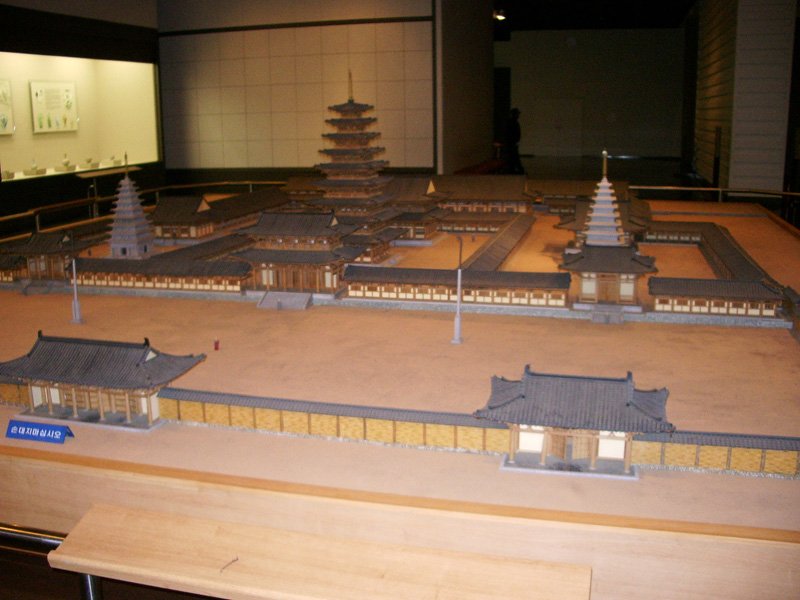
Miniature reconstruction of Mireuk Temple, Iksan, South Korea. 7th century.

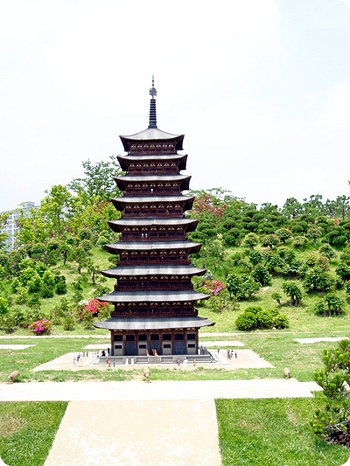
A reconstruction of the great pagoda at Hwangnyongsa.

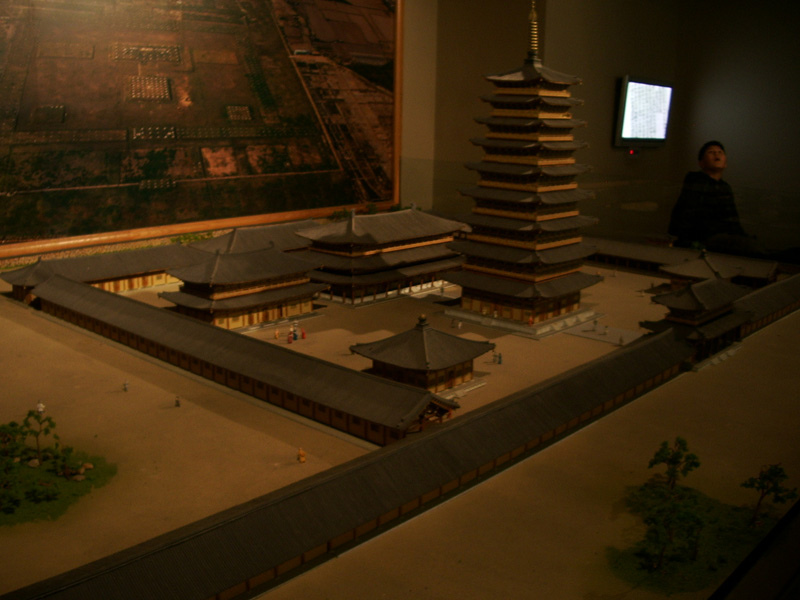
Miniature reconstruction of Hwangnyong Temple, 6th century

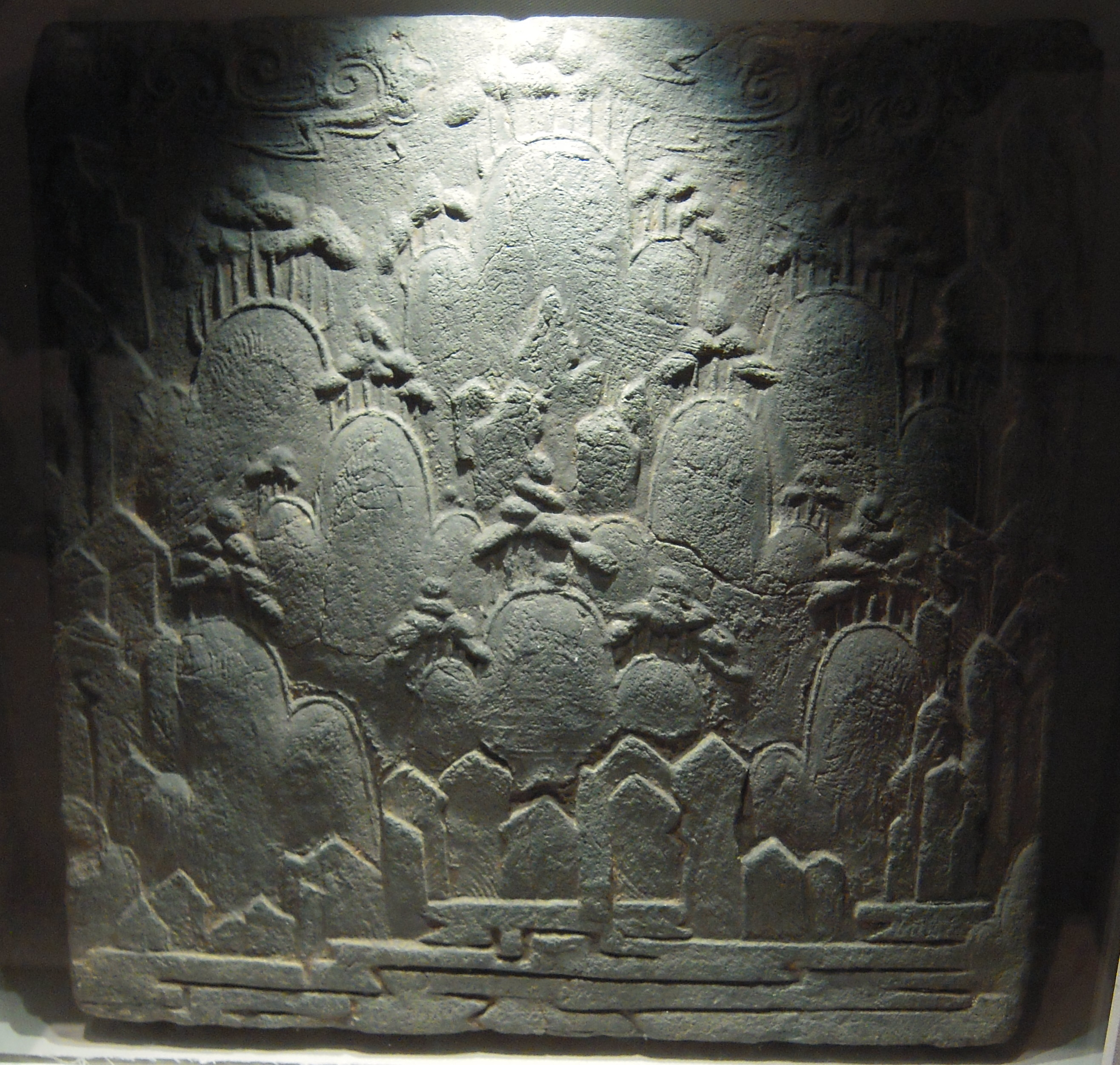
Faint outline of a hip-and-gabled building, perhaps a temple or hermitage in the foreground of a brick excavated from a Baekje temple.

==== Royal architecture ====
Many palaces are recorded as having been built in Baekje. Some traces of them can be found at both Busosanseong, the third palace of this kingdom, and at the site of Gungnamji pond, which is mentioned in the Samguk sagi (History of the Three Kingdoms). Gungnamji means "pond in the south of the palace."

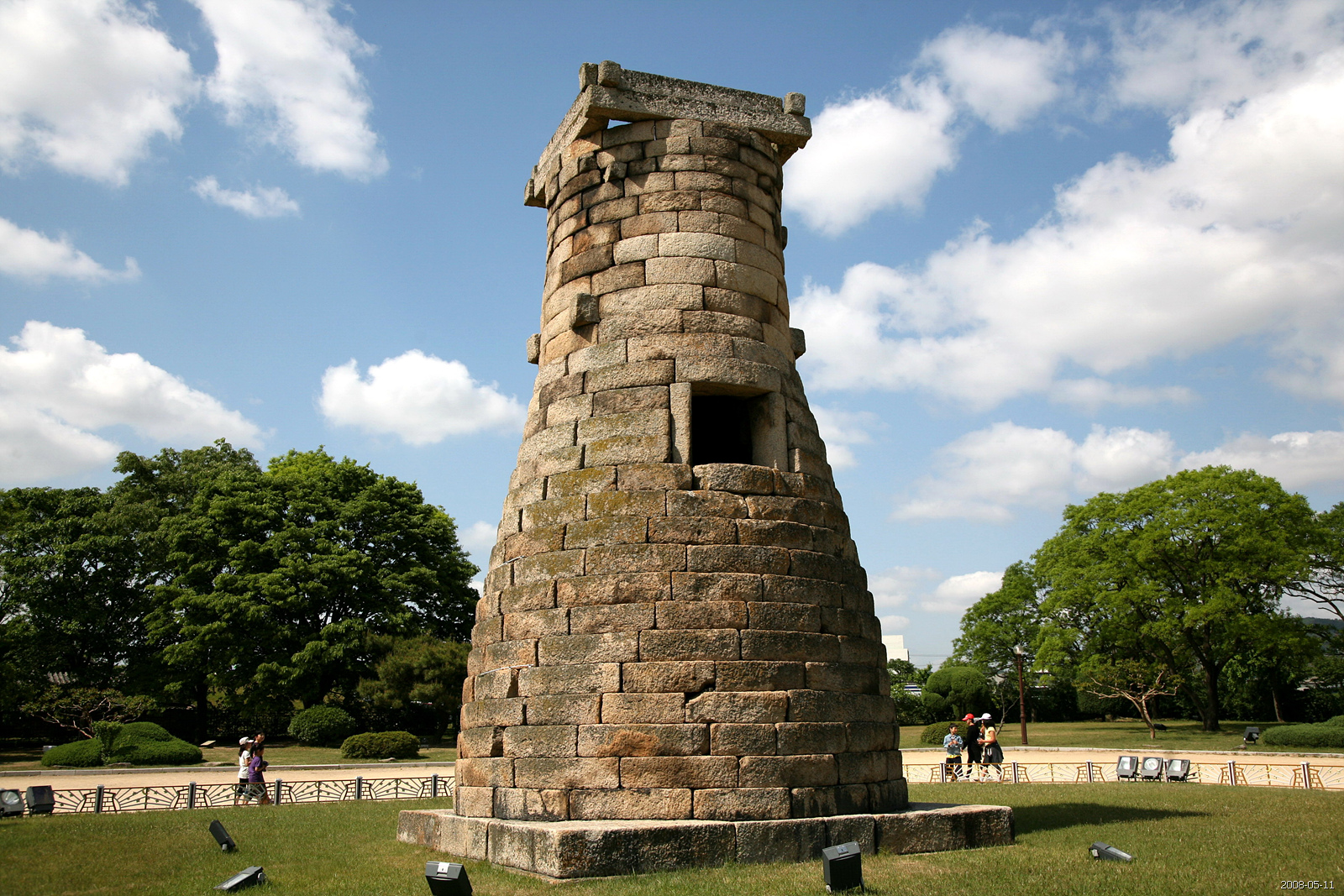
Cheomseongdae, royal observatory.

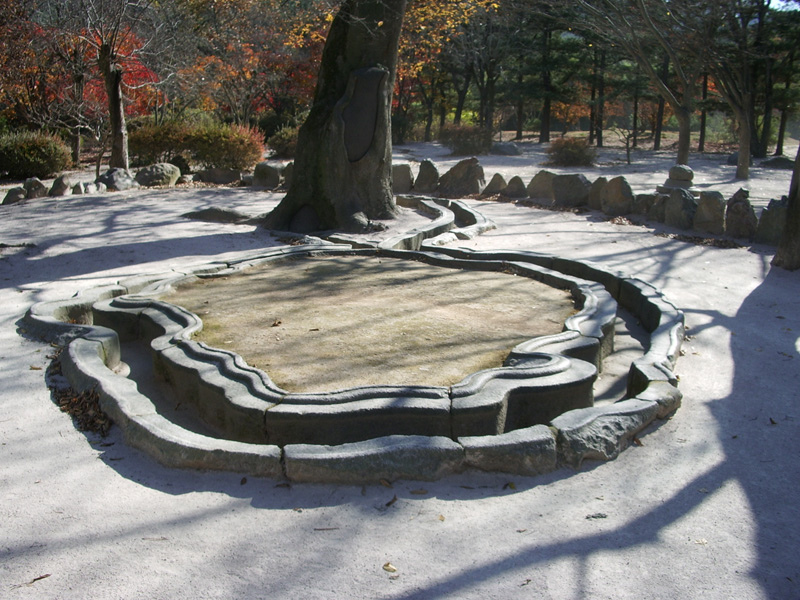
Poseokjeong (Pavilion of Stone Abalone) used to be a grand royal garden.

==== Tomb architecture ====
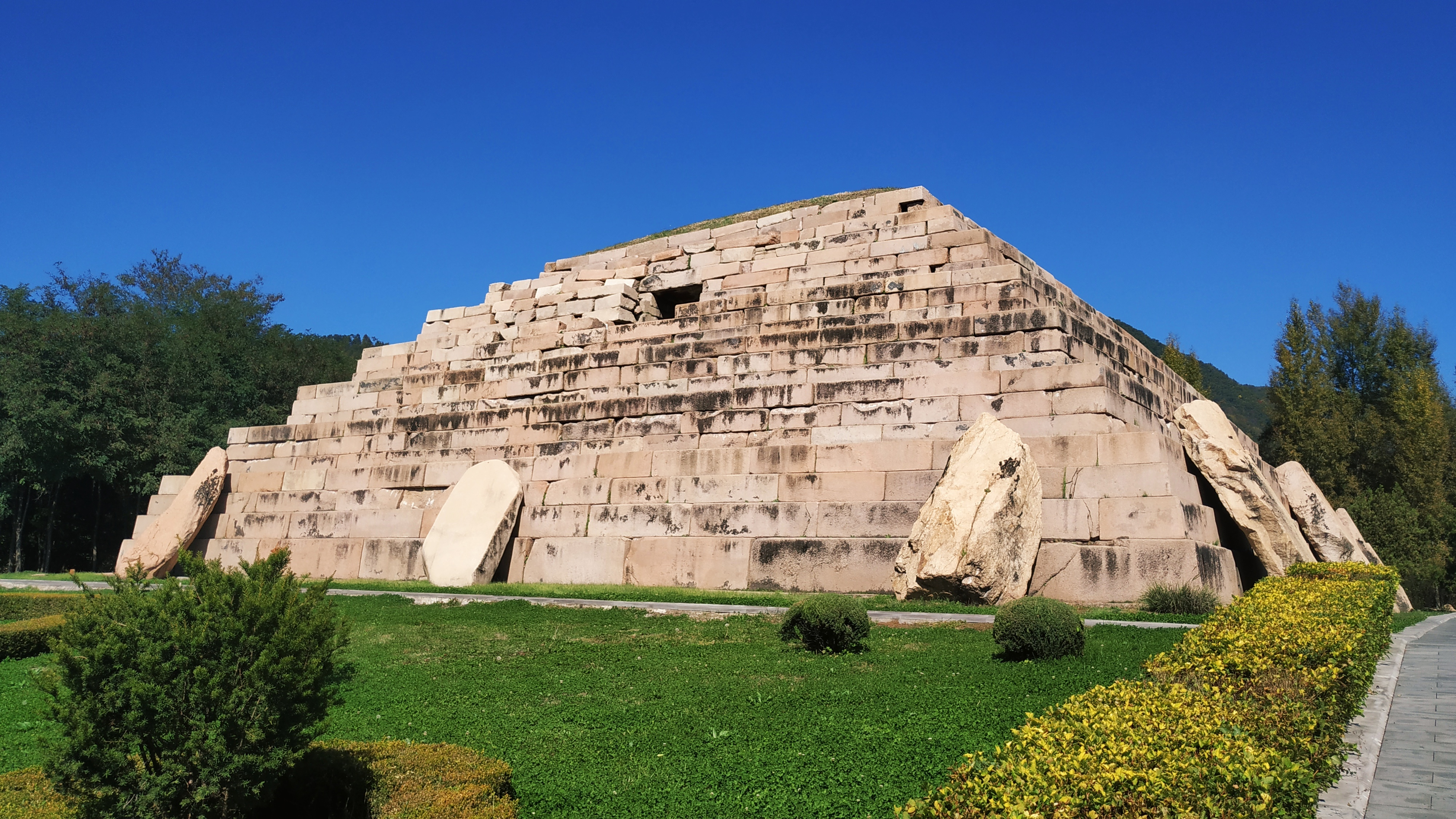
Tomb of the General presumed to be the tomb of a great Goguryeo king or military official. Located in Ji'an, China.

Three Kingdoms Period mortuary architecture was monumental in scale. For example, in Goguryeo two different types of mortuary architecture evolved during this period: one type of burial is a stepped pyramid made of stone, while another is a large earth mound form. The Cheonmachong mounded burial is an example of the monumental style of mortuary architecture in the ancient Silla capital at Gyeongju.

Murals in tombs dating from Goguryeo also reveal a great deal about the architecture of that period as many of them depict buildings which have pillars with entasis called baeheulimgidoong (배흘림기둥) in Korean. Many have capitals on top of them. The murals reveal that the wooden bracket structures and coloring on the timbers, all characteristic of later Korean structures, were already in use at that time.

Korea also has a rich architectural heritage of tombs and town-wall construction. The brick tomb of King Muryong (501–523 AD) is remarkable for its vaulted ceiling and arch construction.

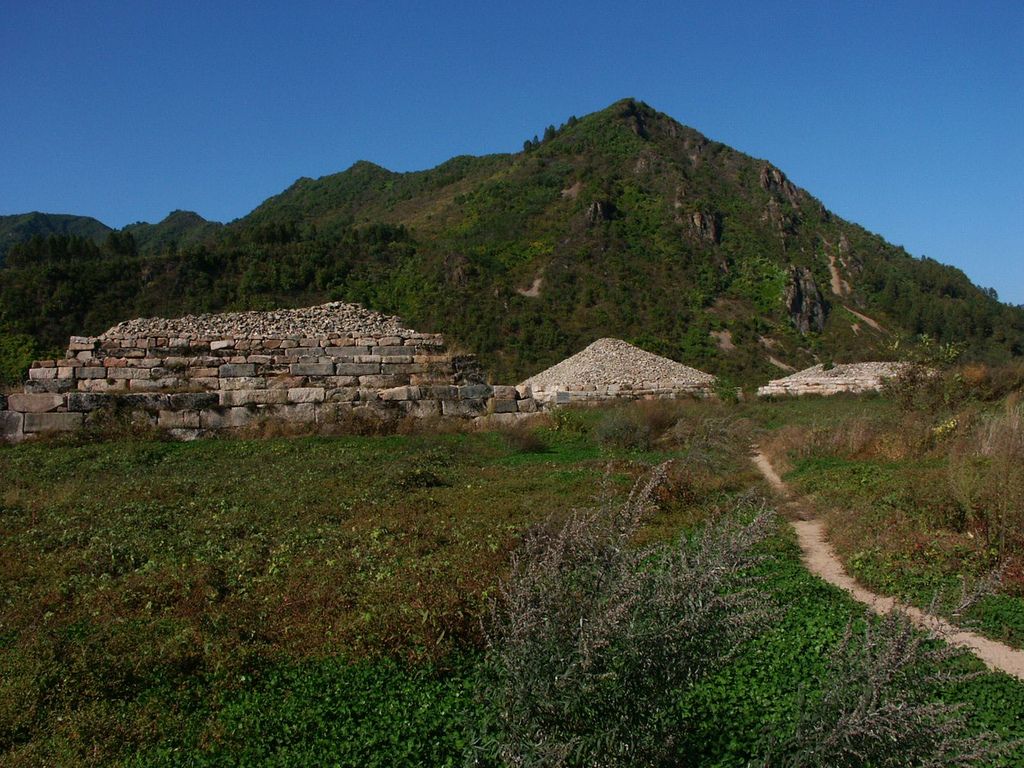
Goguryeo tombs, 5th century, Jian, China.

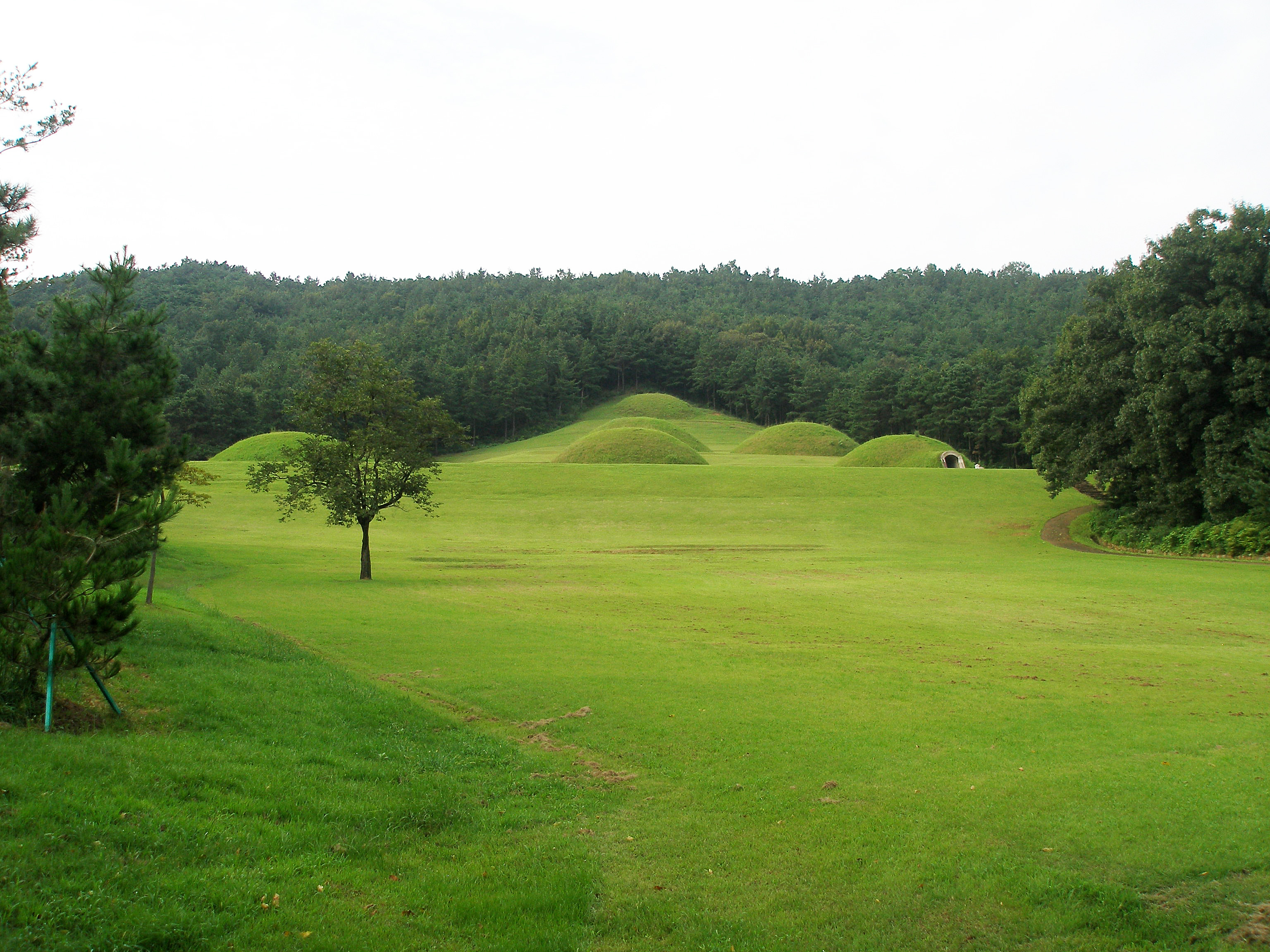
Baekje royal tomb complex, Buyeo, South Korea.

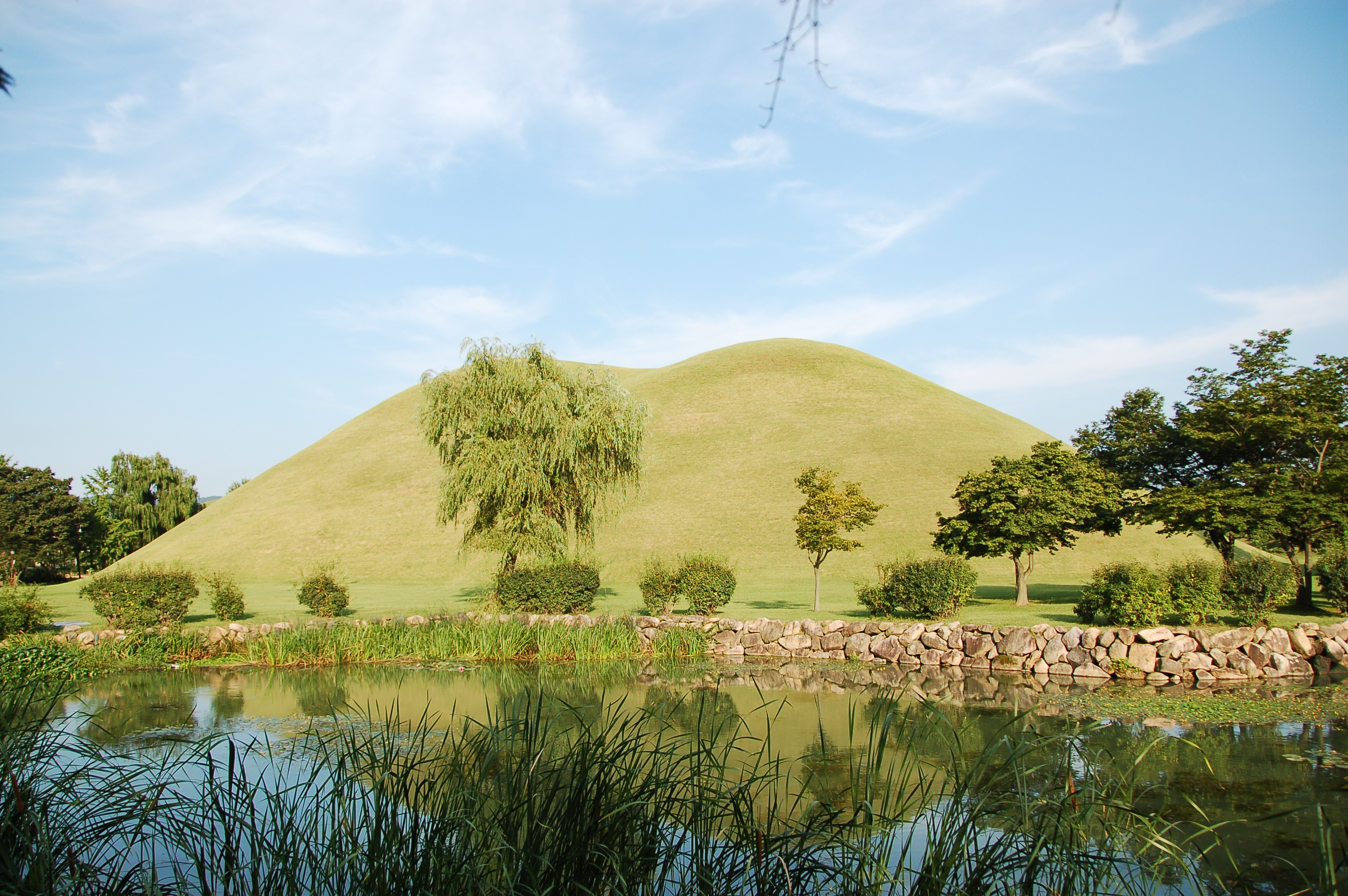
Hwangnam Great Tomb, a double-mounded tomb for a king and queen of Silla.

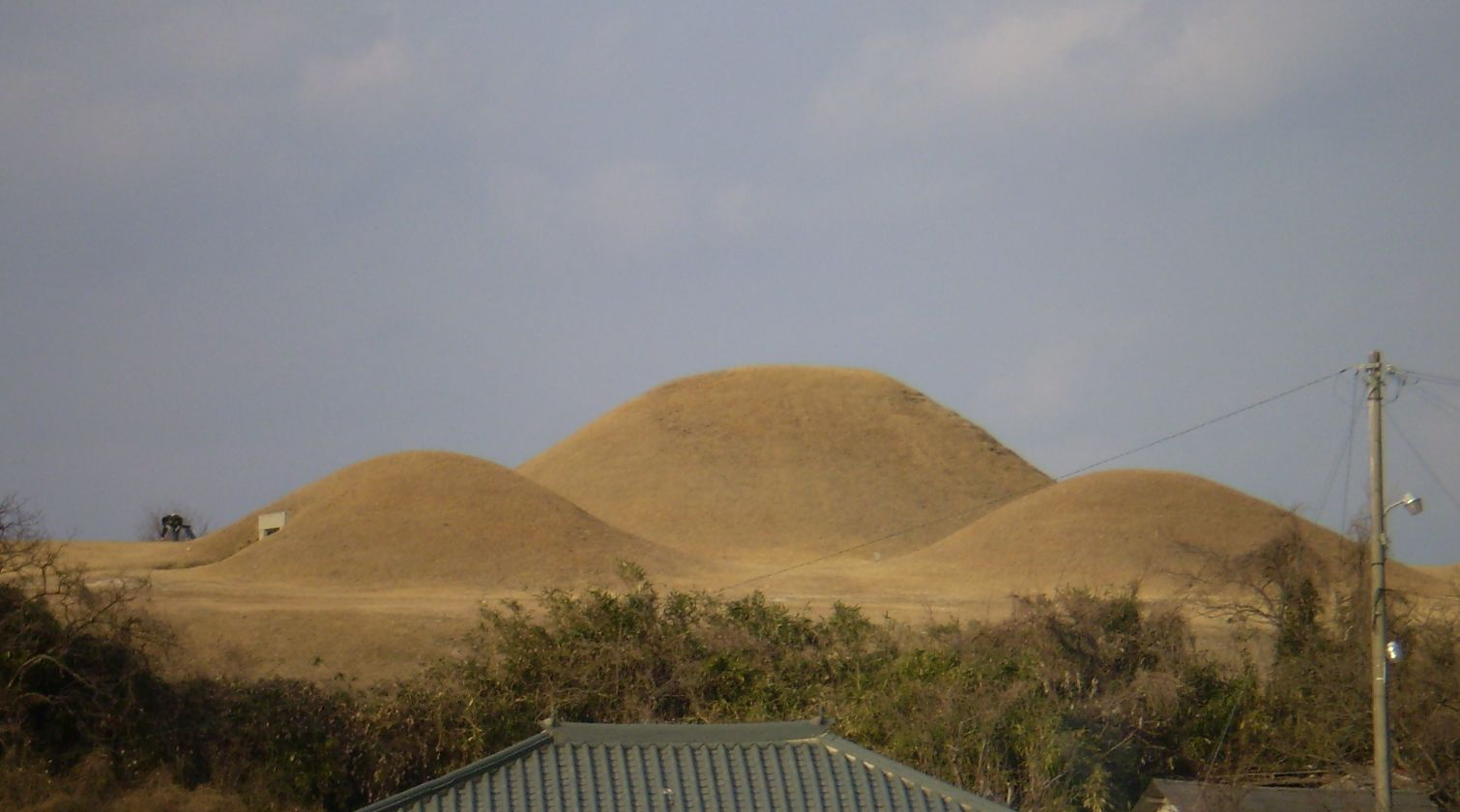
Royal tombs of Bihwa Gaya.

=== North-South States period (698–926) ===
North South States Period (698–926) refers to the period in Korean history when Silla and Balhae coexisted in the southern and northern part of Korea, respectively.

==== Religious architecture ====
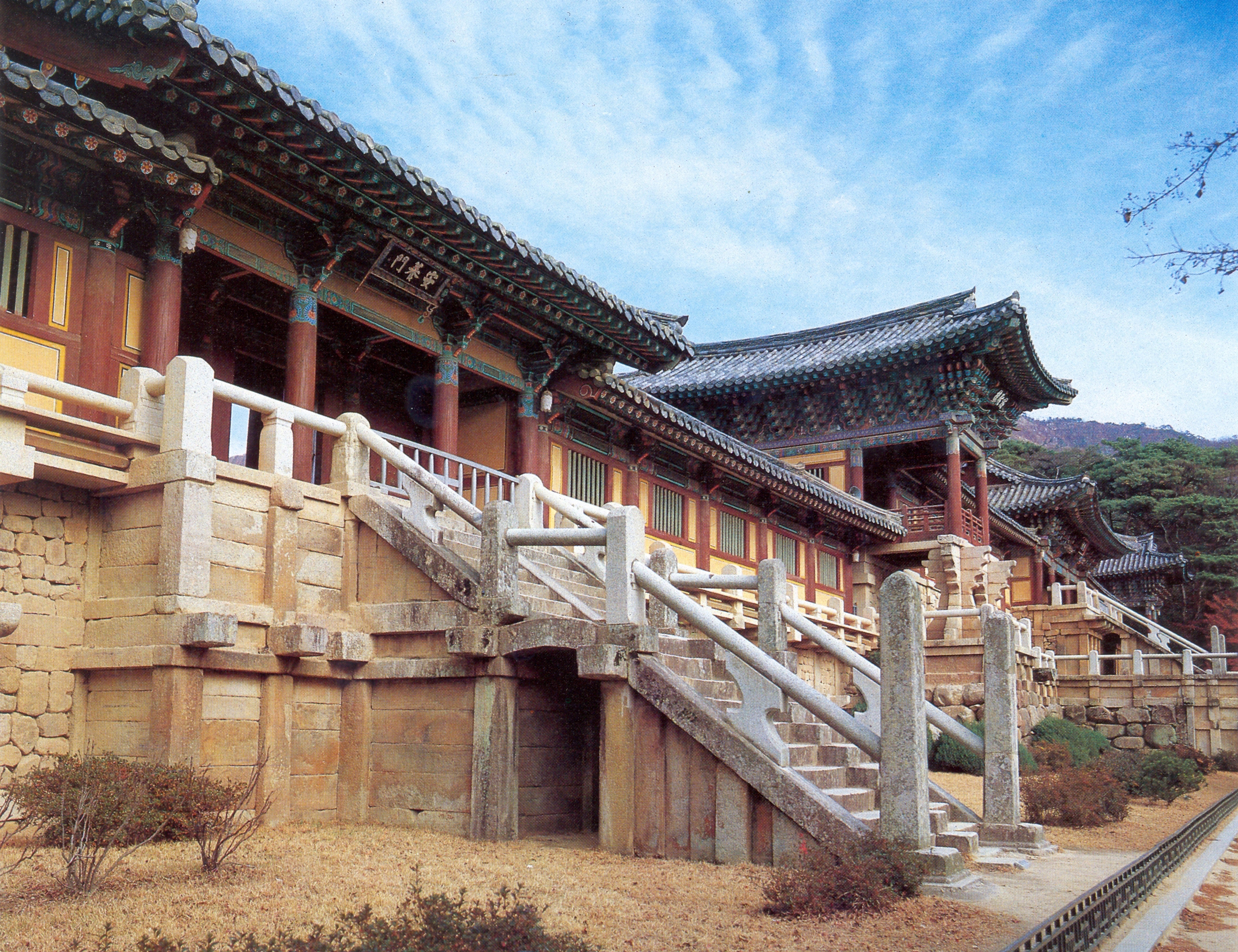
Lotus Flower Bridge and Seven Treasure Bridge at Bulguksa.

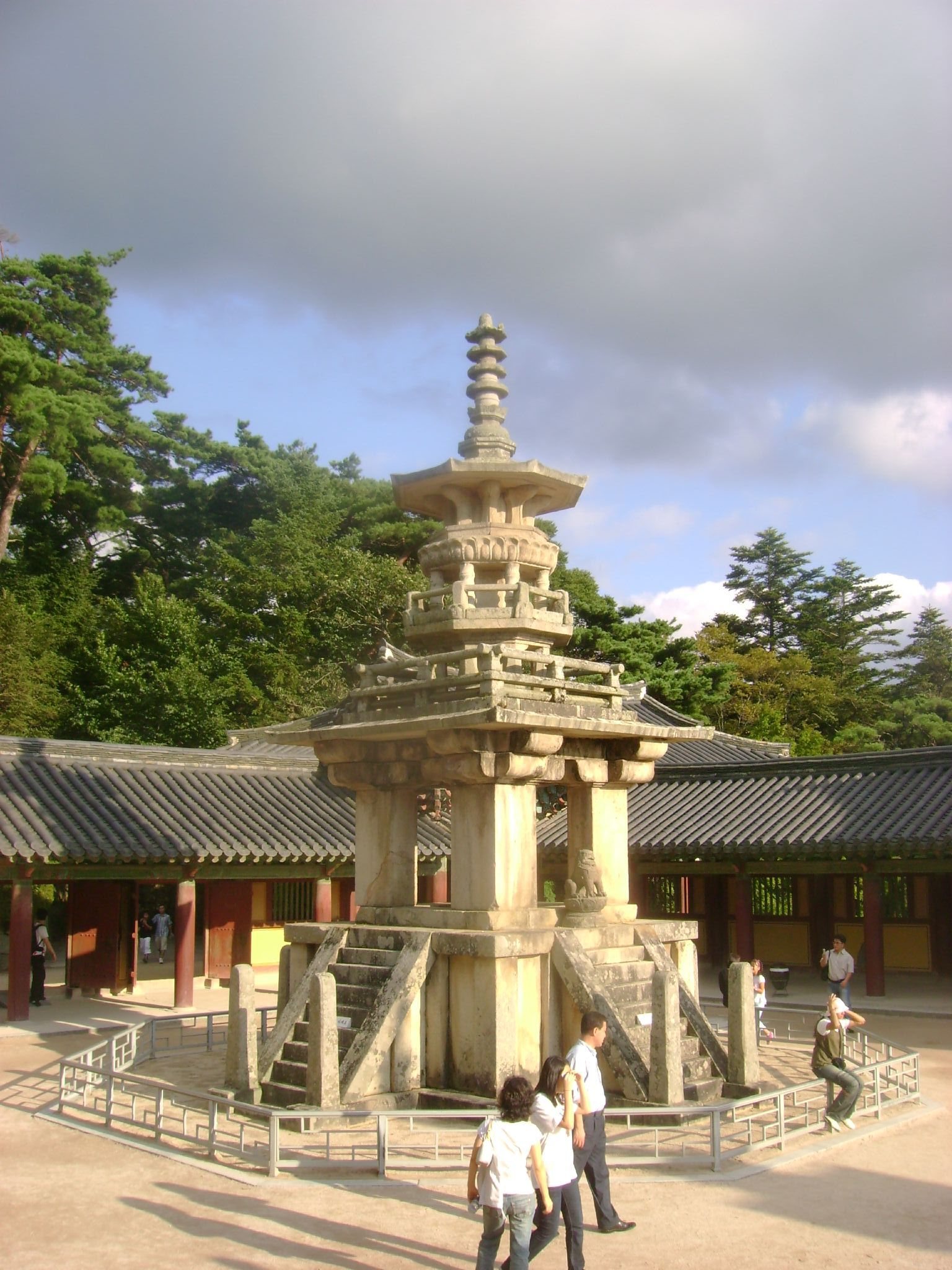
Dabo Pagoda, a national treasure of South Korea.

Bulguk Temple, a UNESCO World Heritage Site.

The plans of Buddhist temples were characterized by two pagodas in front of the central main hall in a symmetrical layout on the north–south axis with other buildings. Bulguksa Temple, built on a stone platform at the foothill of Mt. Toham near Gyeongju, is the oldest existing temple in Korea. The temple was first founded early in the 6th century and was entirely rebuilt and enlarged in 752. The original platform and foundations have remained intact to the present, but the existing wooden buildings were reconstructed during the Joseon period.

The stone work of the two-story platform exhibits a superb sense of architectural organization and advanced building methods. Two stone pagodas stand in front of the main hall of the temple. The simpler Seokgatap located to the left of the court represents Buddha's manifestation in a transcendent calm. It has three stories with two pedestal layers and a total height reaching about twenty-five feet. The pagoda consists of simple undecorated pedestal slabs and three-story stupa each of which has five stepped eaves and truncated roofs. These characteristics constitute a typical form of the Korean stone pagodas.

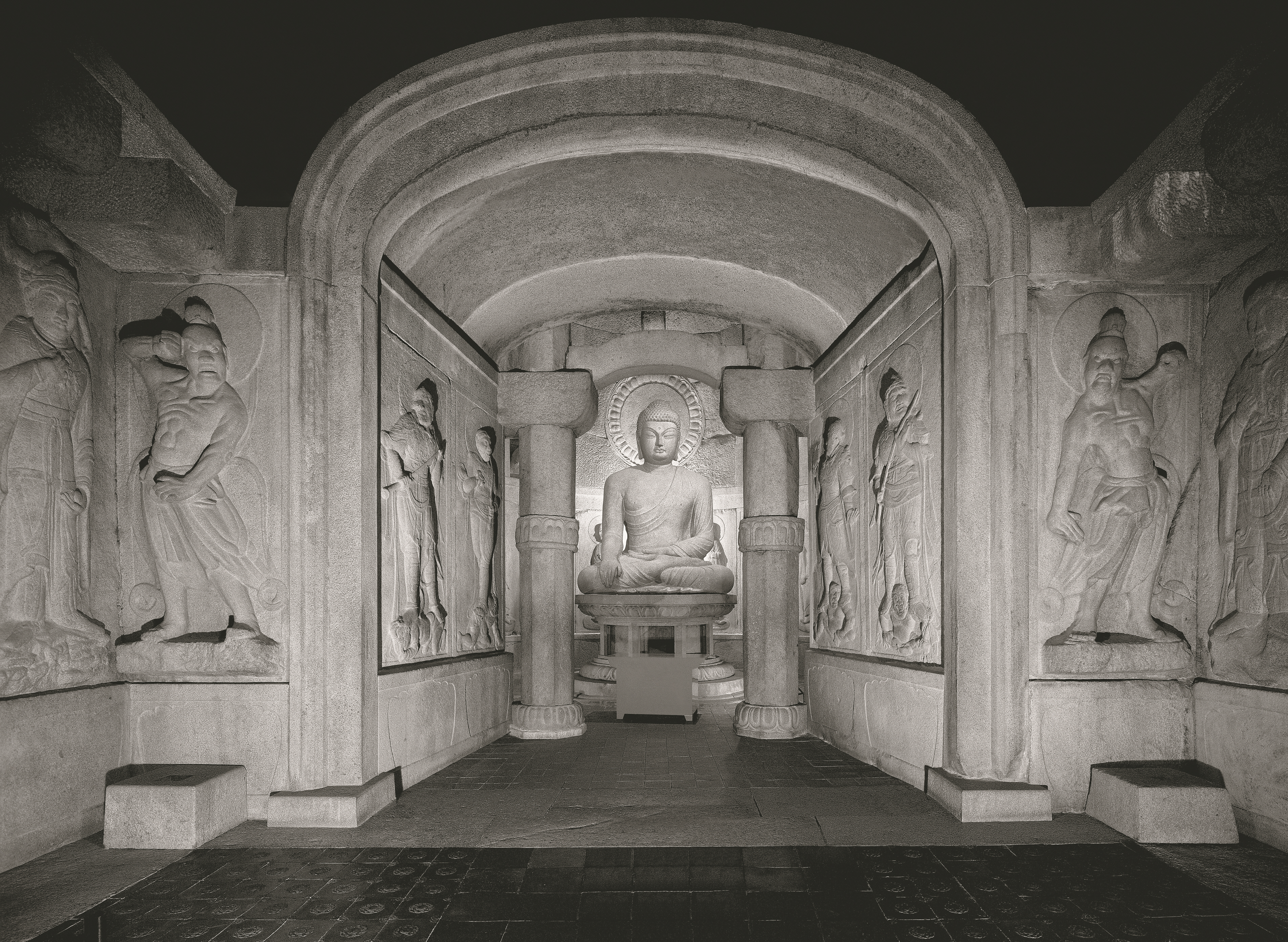
Seokguram Grotto, a UNESCO World Heritage Site. An artificial granite cave.

To the right of the court, the complex Dabotap represents Buddha's manifestation in a diversified universe, and is unique in Korea, further so in Asia. With a height of thirty-five feet, this pagoda has one pedestal with a staircase on each side, four main stories with balustrade and is characterized by the final crown-ball-and-plate sequence. The design motif of the lotus flower is apparent in mouldings and other details of the pagoda.

The rock cave shrine of Seokguram is located on the crest of Mt. Toham. It was built by the same master architect of Bulguksa Temple, and built around the same era. This cave shrine was artificially and skillfully constructed with granite blocks and covered with an earth mound on top to give the appearance of a natural landscape. The shrine boasts a rectangular anteroom lined with large stone slabs carved with the figures of the protectors of Buddhism on each side of the walls and at the entrance passageway to the main chamber. The circular main chamber covered by an elegant dome ceiling and surrounded by carved stone wall panels depicting Boddhisattvas and the ten disciples. The graceful statue of Buddha on a lotus pedestal in the center is the dominant feature of the chamber.

Rock cave shrines are not rare in Asia, but few of these shrines and sculptures reveal such high level of artistry. None are as religiously and artistically complete in overall design as those at Seokguram

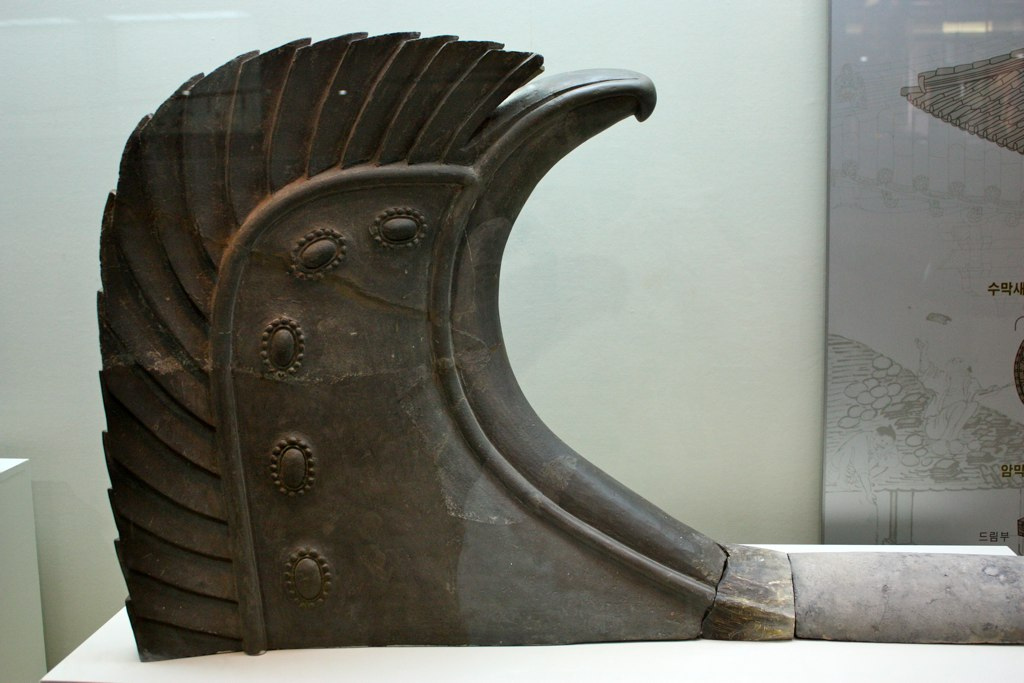
Roof end tile shaped like an owl's tail, chimi in Korean.

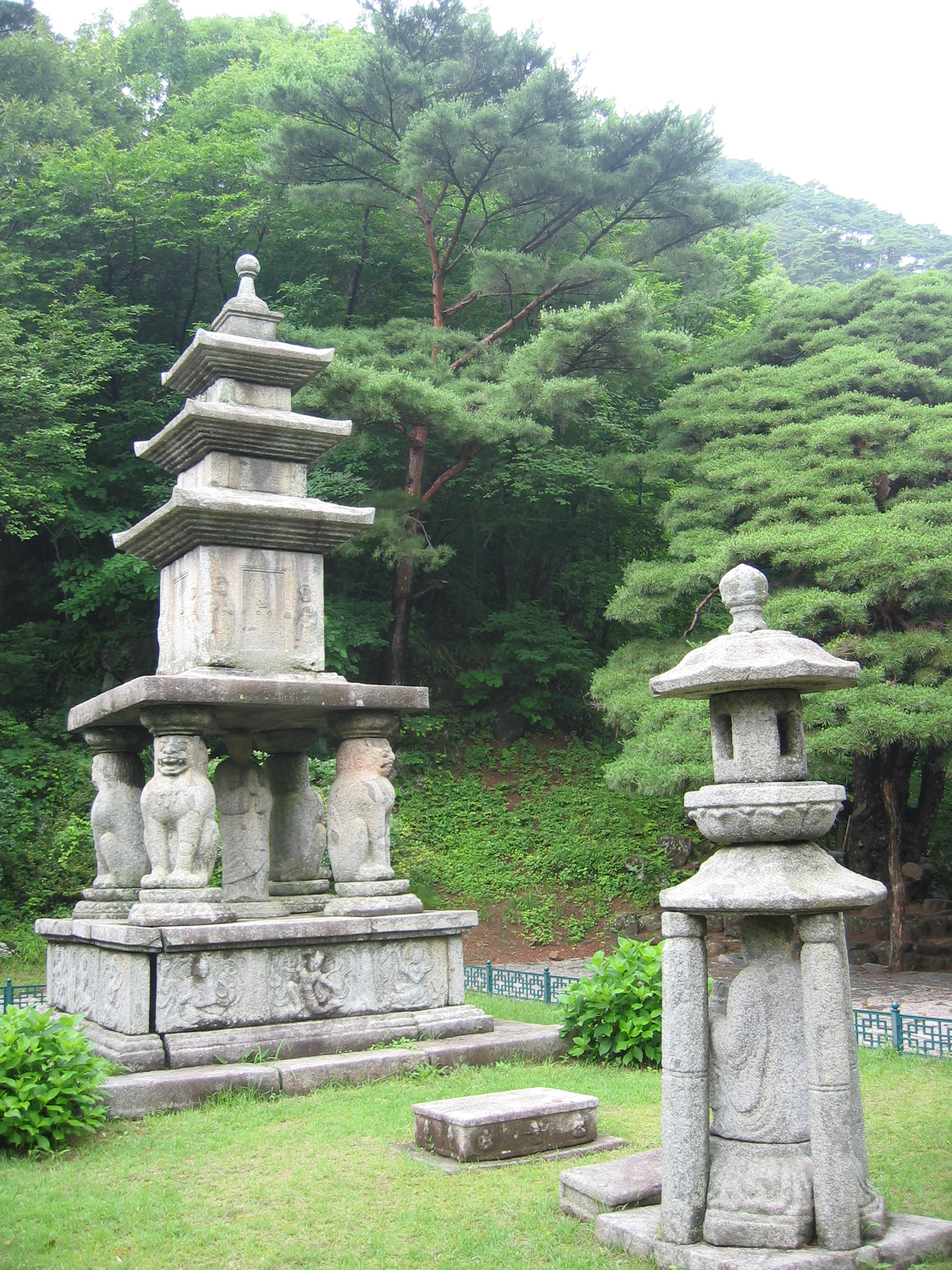
The Lion Pagoda of Hwaeomsa or Four-Lion Three-Story Stone Pagoda is located at the South Korean Buddhist temple of Hwaeomsa, in Gurye County, Jeollanam-do.

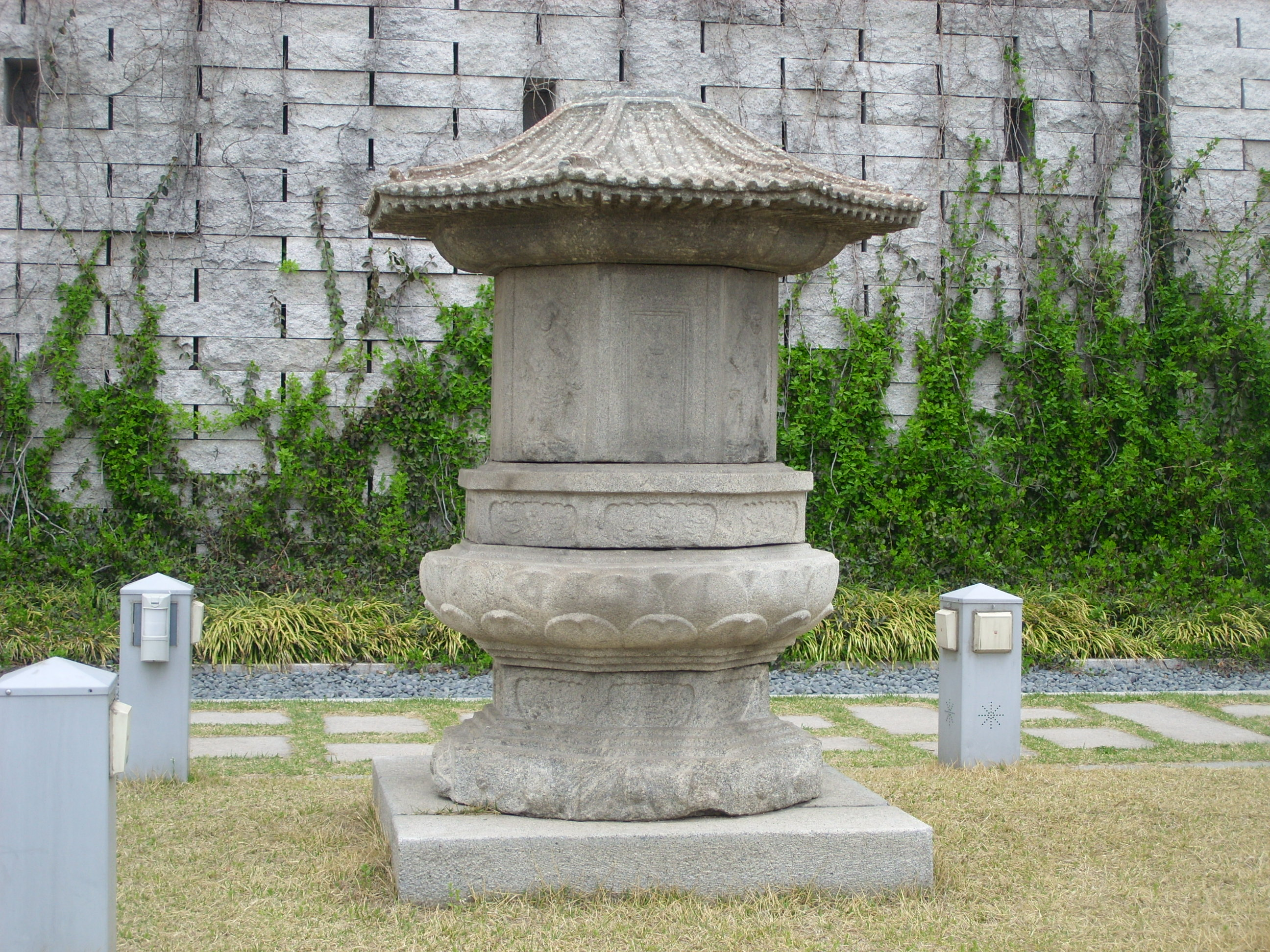
Granite memorial stupa carved in the shape of an eight-sided roof, National Museum of Korea.

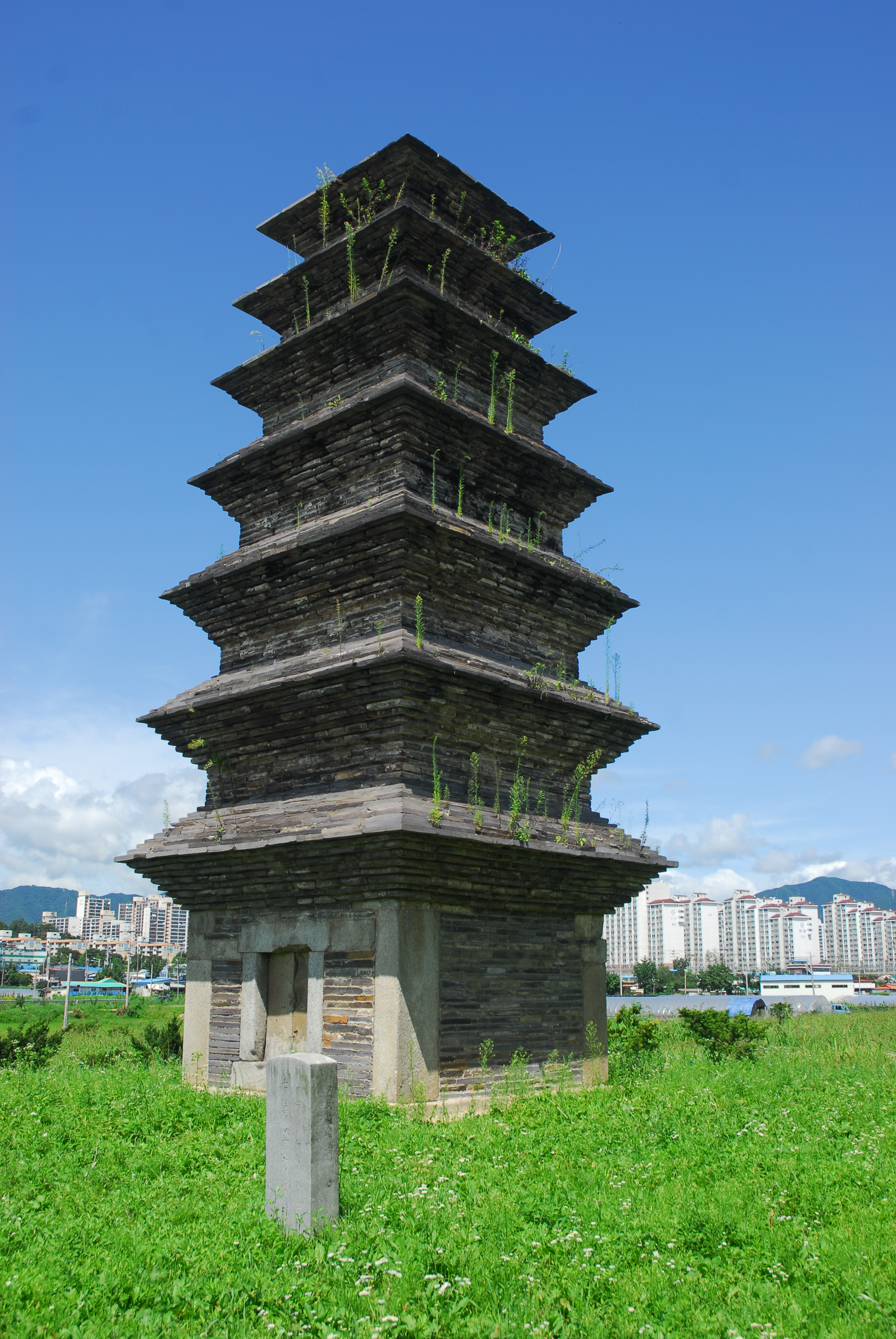
Seven-story Stone Pagoda in Jangnak-dong, Jecheon

Seven-story Stone Pagoda in Tappyeong-ri, Chungju
Built in 796

==== Royal architecture ====
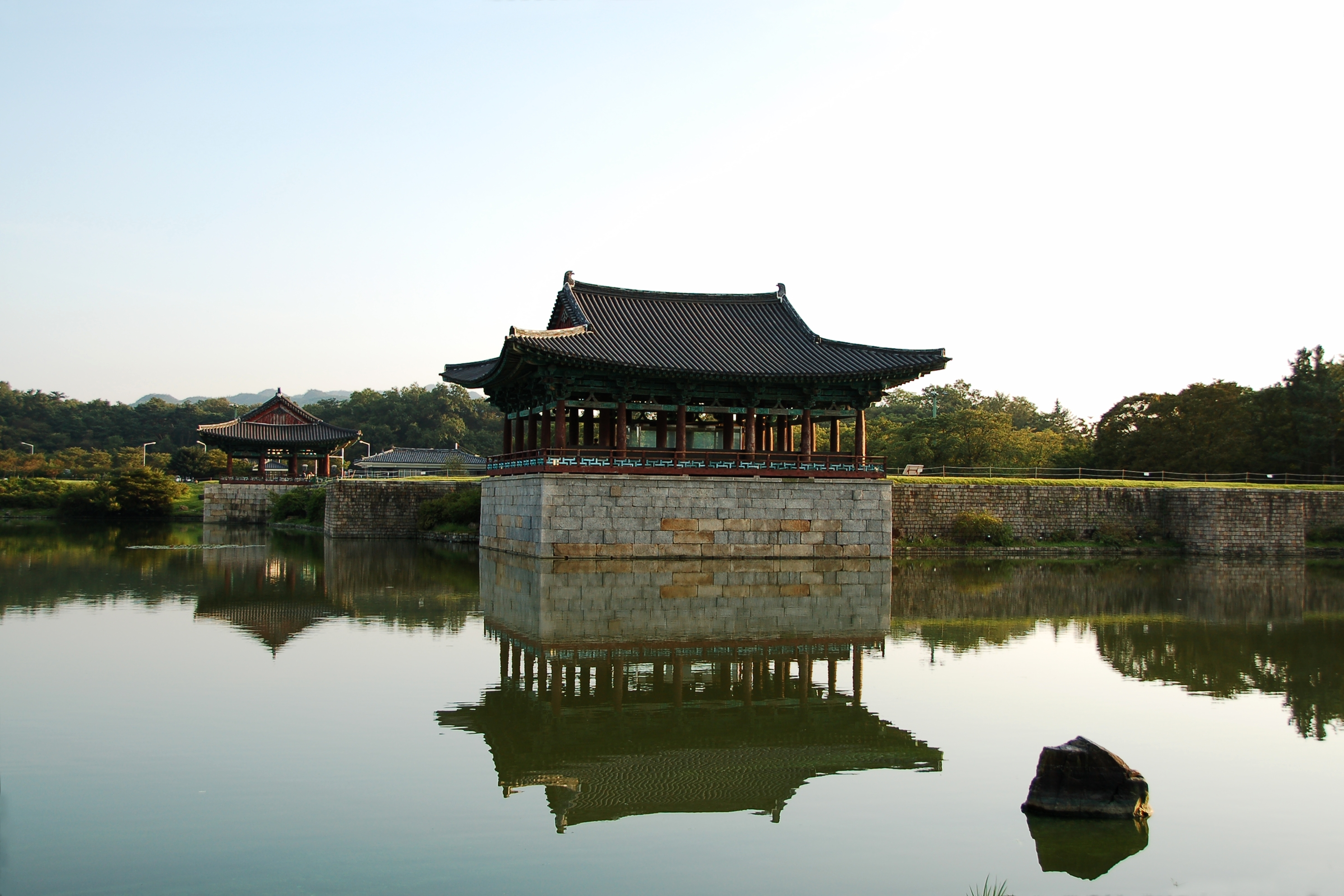
Anapji is an artificial pond in Gyeongju, South Korea. It was part of the palace complex of ancient Silla. It was constructed by order of King Munmu in 674 CE.

United Silla architecture is defined as from the 7th century to the 10th century. After the unification of the Korean peninsula into the kingdom of United Silla, Korean Silla institutions were radically transformed. United Silla absorbed the fully matured culture of the Tang dynasty in China, and at the same time developed a unique cultural identity. New Buddhist sects were introduced from the Tang and Buddhist art flourished. It was a period of peace and cultural advancement in all fields of the arts.

Architecture flourished in the royal capital of Gyeongju, though almost all traces of the former glory have vanished at the present time. The city had nearly 200,000 inhabitants at its peak, and was strategically located at the junction of two rivers and three mountains that encircle a fertile basin of about 170 km^{2} in area. The urban area of the city was developed and expanded in three stages. In the second stage, when Hwangnyongsa Temple was located in the center, the region was developed into a grid network of road patterns with wide streets.

One of the palace sites is marked by the artificial lake of Anapji with stone works of retaining walls delineating the former building location. The residential district of the nobles in the city was composed of great houses which were constructed conforming to the building code that granted privileges to the nobles, but forbidden to the commoners. Tiles from many ruins of the buildings were found everywhere. Of those that are still intact, show elegant and graceful design.

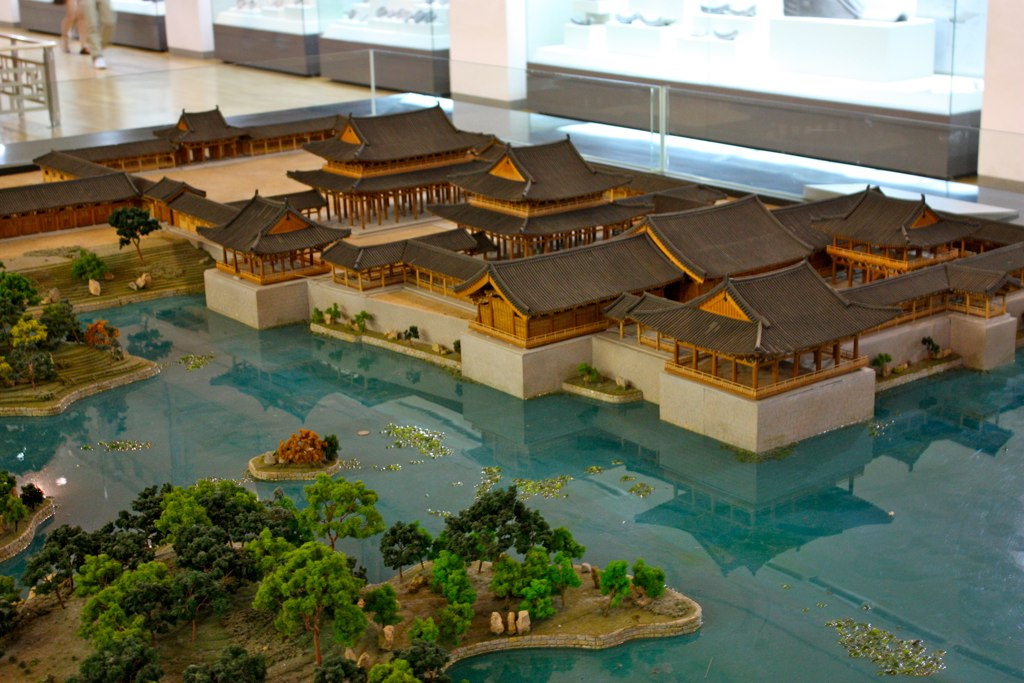
Model reconstruction of the Anapji Pond royal complex

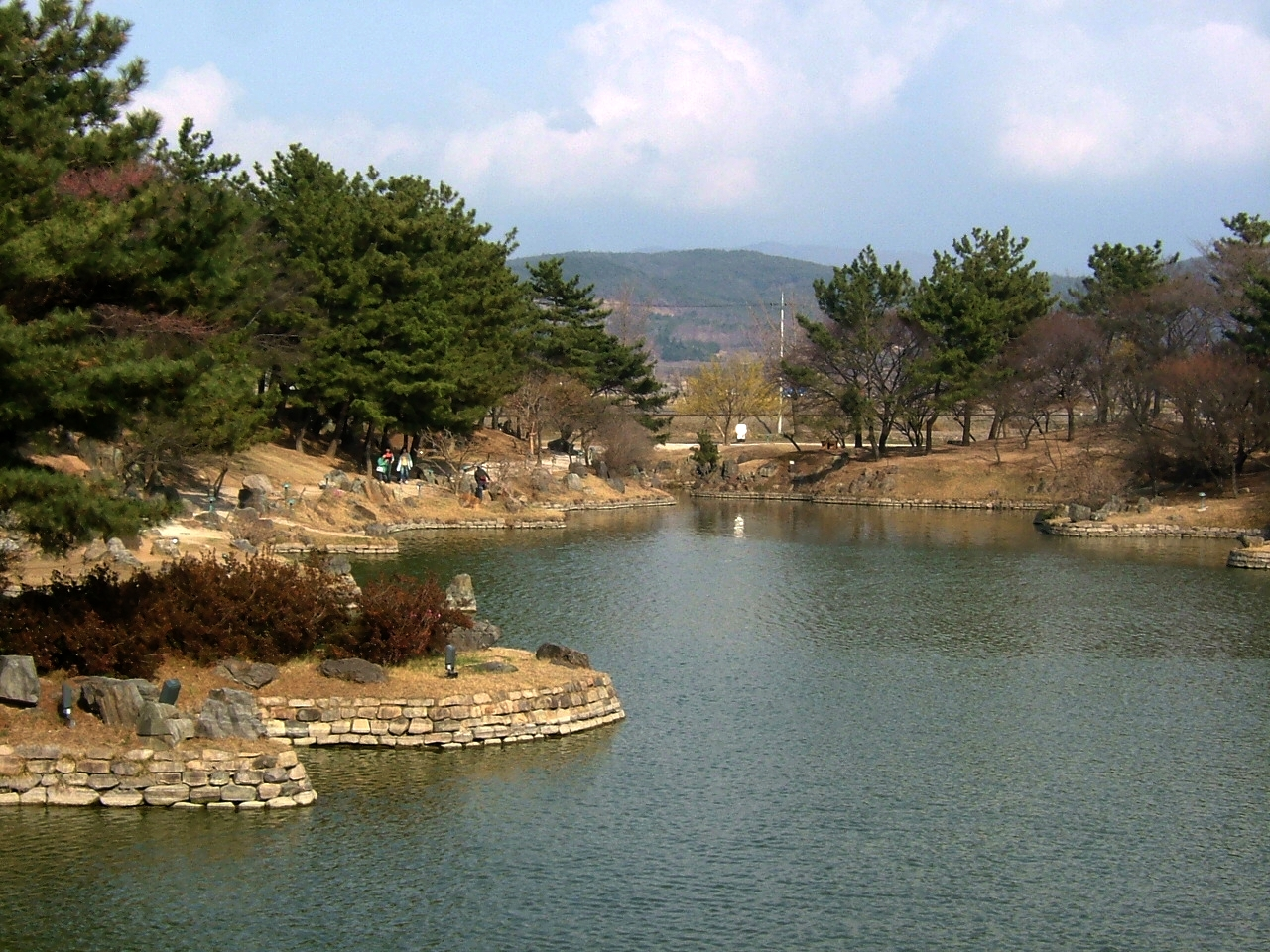
Anapji pond in Gyeongju

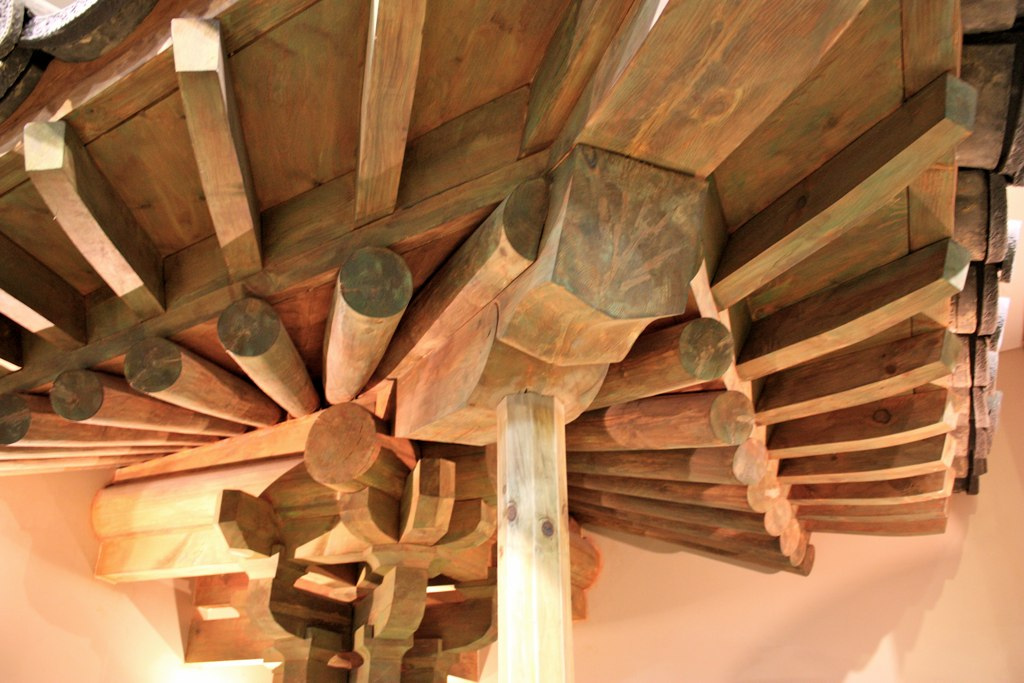
Details of wooden construction reconstructed from archaeological remains recovered from a dredging of Anapji pond. Gyeongju National Museum.

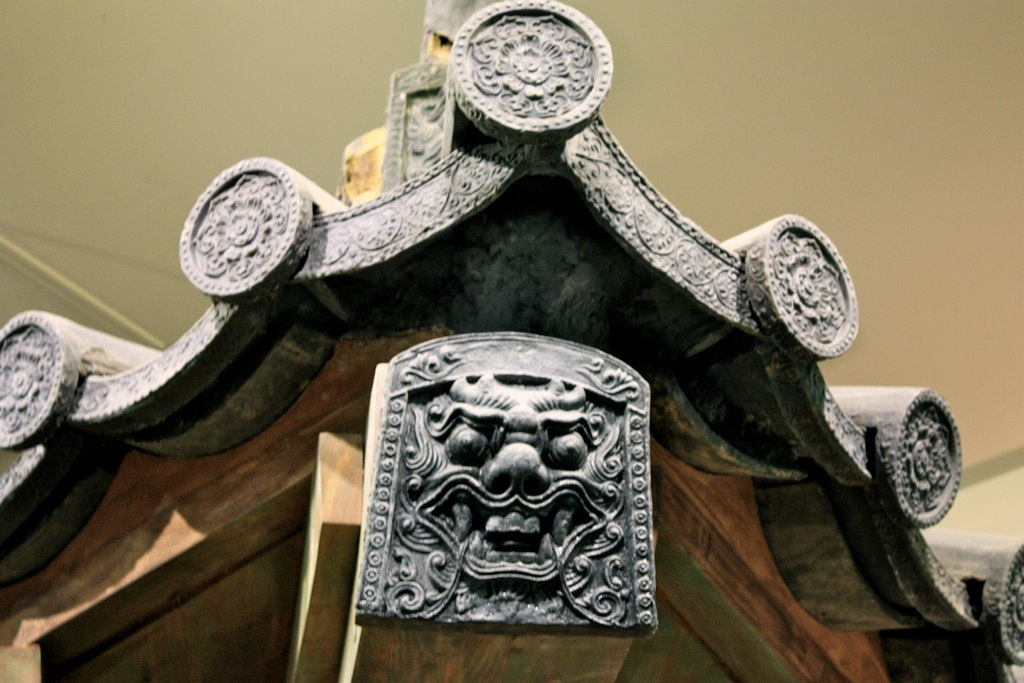
End tile detail

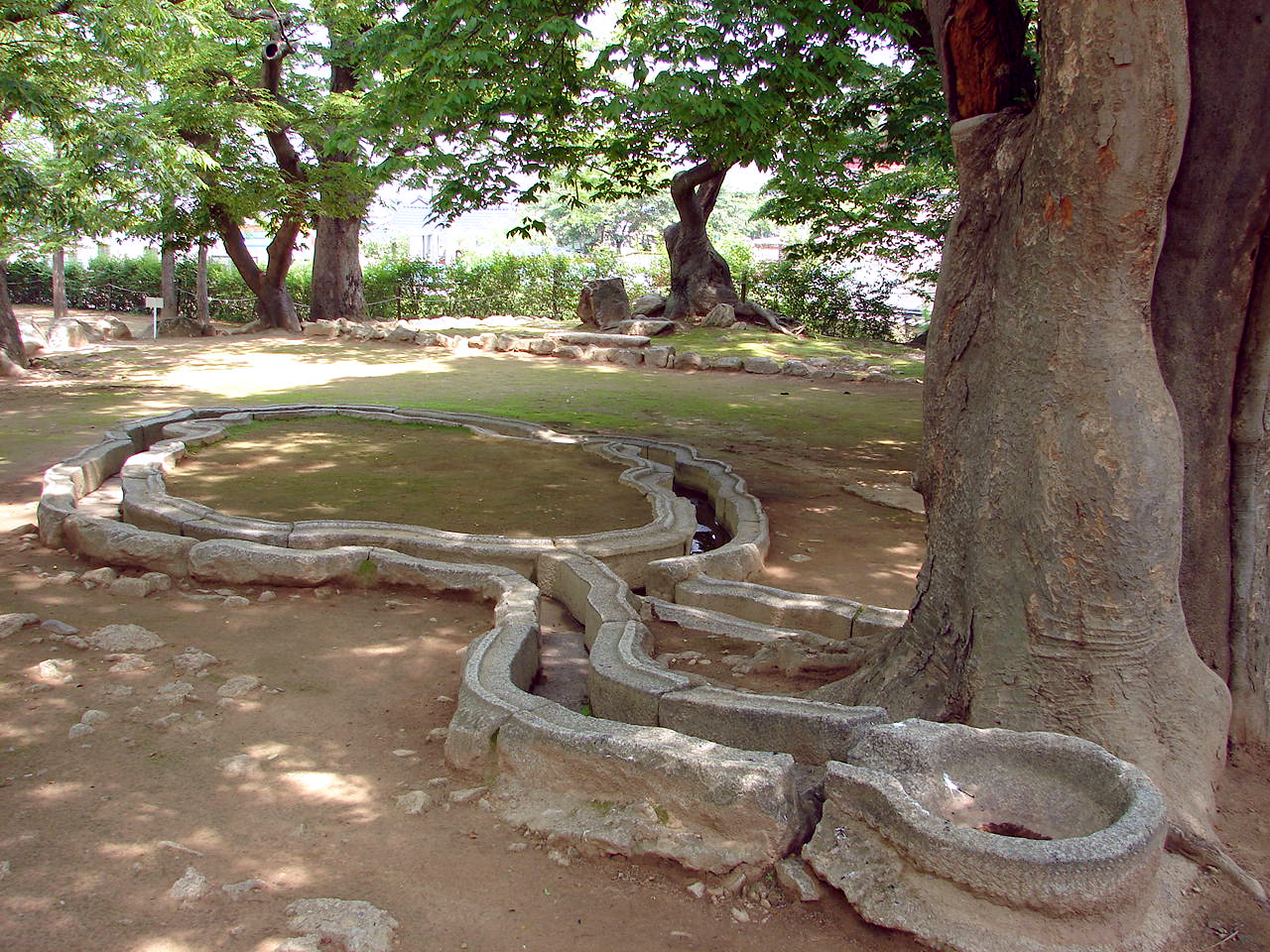
Gyeongju-Poseokjeong site 3832-06

==== Balhae (698–926) ====
The composite nature of the northern Korean Kingdom of Balhae (698–926) art can be found in the two tombs of Balhae Princesses. Shown are some aristocrats, warriors, and musicians and maids of the Balhae people, who are depicted in the mural painting in the Tomb of Princess Jeonghyo, a daughter of King Mun (737–793), the third monarch of the kingdom. The murals displayed the image of the Balhae people in its completeness. The Mausoleum of Princess Jeonghyo (Korean: 정효공주묘, Chinese: zhēnxiào gōngzhǔ mù; 贞孝公主墓), made in 793 by the people of the early Balhae kingdom, contains, among other things, the first complete discovered and detailed murals done by Balhae artists, and hence provides valuable insights to historians.

The mausoleum originally had a funerary pagoda made from brick and stone slabs, in addition to a tumulus. Only the pagoda's foundations remain, which show that it was originally square, measuring 5.50x5.65 m. Below the funerary pagoda and tumulus, the princess' burial comprised an entry passage, tomb entrance, internal passage, and burial chamber. The burial chamber is underground, and was excavated in October 1980. The burial chamber measured 2.10x3.10 m and was built from bricks, with stone slabs forming the roof. The mounds of earth lined with stones demonstrate the continuance of Goguryeo-style tomb but the formal clothing shows Tang style, which implies that Korean Balhae actively accepted the Chinese Tang culture. There were originally 12 murals depicting people on the rear walls of the internal passage and north, east, and west walls of the burial chamber. The chamber is surrounded by four murals on each wall, depicting thirteen people in action, such as warriors (3), chamber attendants, musicians, and maids, wearing red, blue, yellow, purple, and brown robes. The murals displayed the image of the Balhae people in its completeness for the first time.

=== Goryeo (918–1392) ===
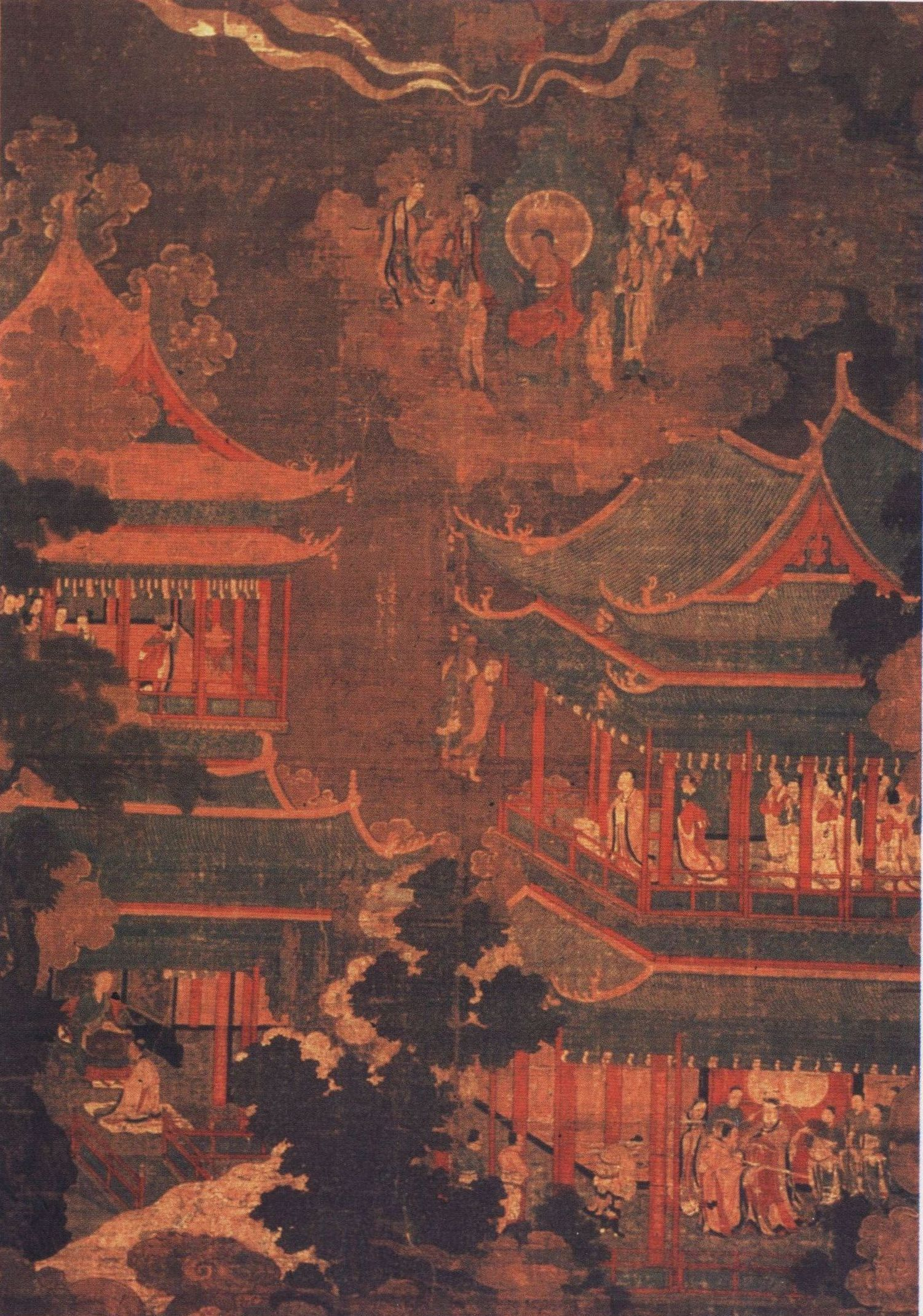
A Goryeo painting depicting a royal palace.

Goryeo architecture is defined as the period between the 10th century and the 14th century. Much of the architecture in this period was related to religion and influenced by political power/ kingdom. Many buildings such as magnificent Buddhist temples and pagodas were developed based on religious needs, as Buddhism played an important role in the culture and society at the time. It is unfortunate that little has survived to the present day, since most of the architecture from this period was built of wood. Also, the capital of Goryeo was based in Kaesong, a city in modern-day North Korea. Its location has made it difficult for many historians in South Korea to study and analyze the architecture of this era.

Few remaining wooden structures from the late Goryeo period in South Korea show us significantly simpler bracketing than those from the Joseon period architecture. Bright and soft coloring of these structures had been further developed since the Three Kingdoms era.

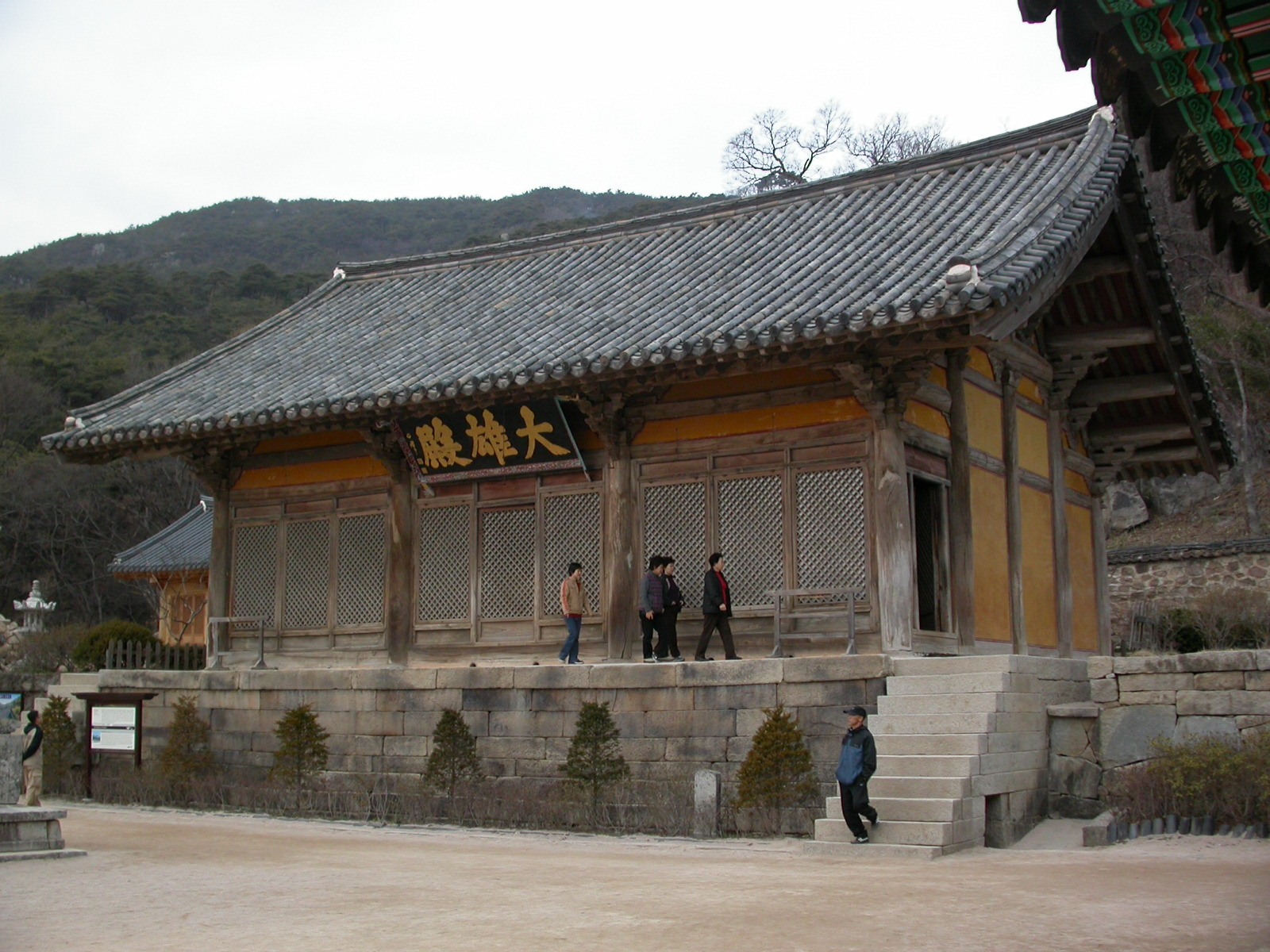
Daeungjeon Hall of Sudeoksa Temple.

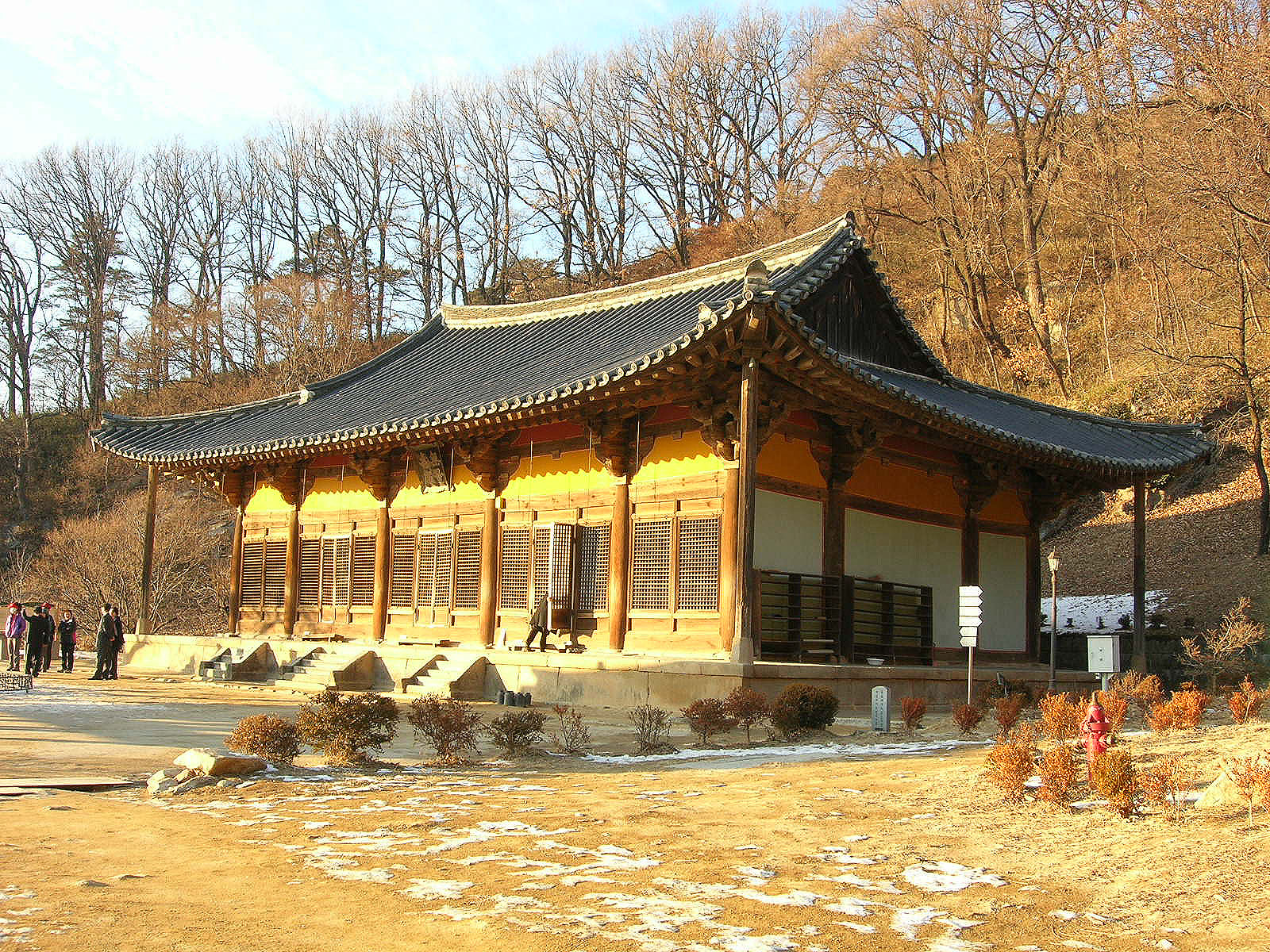
Muryangsujeon (Main Hall) at Buseoksa Temple.

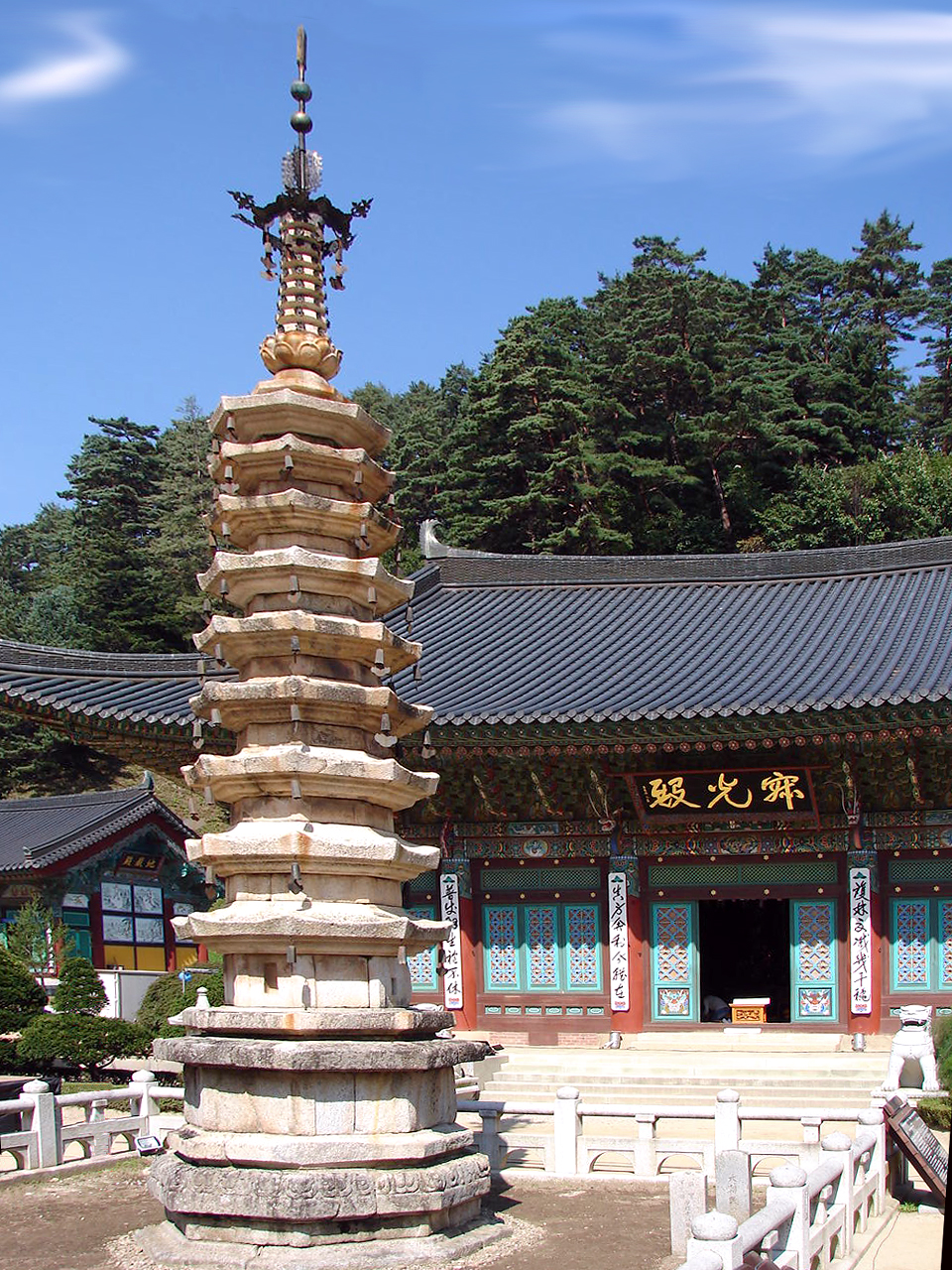
Woljeong Temple pagoda.

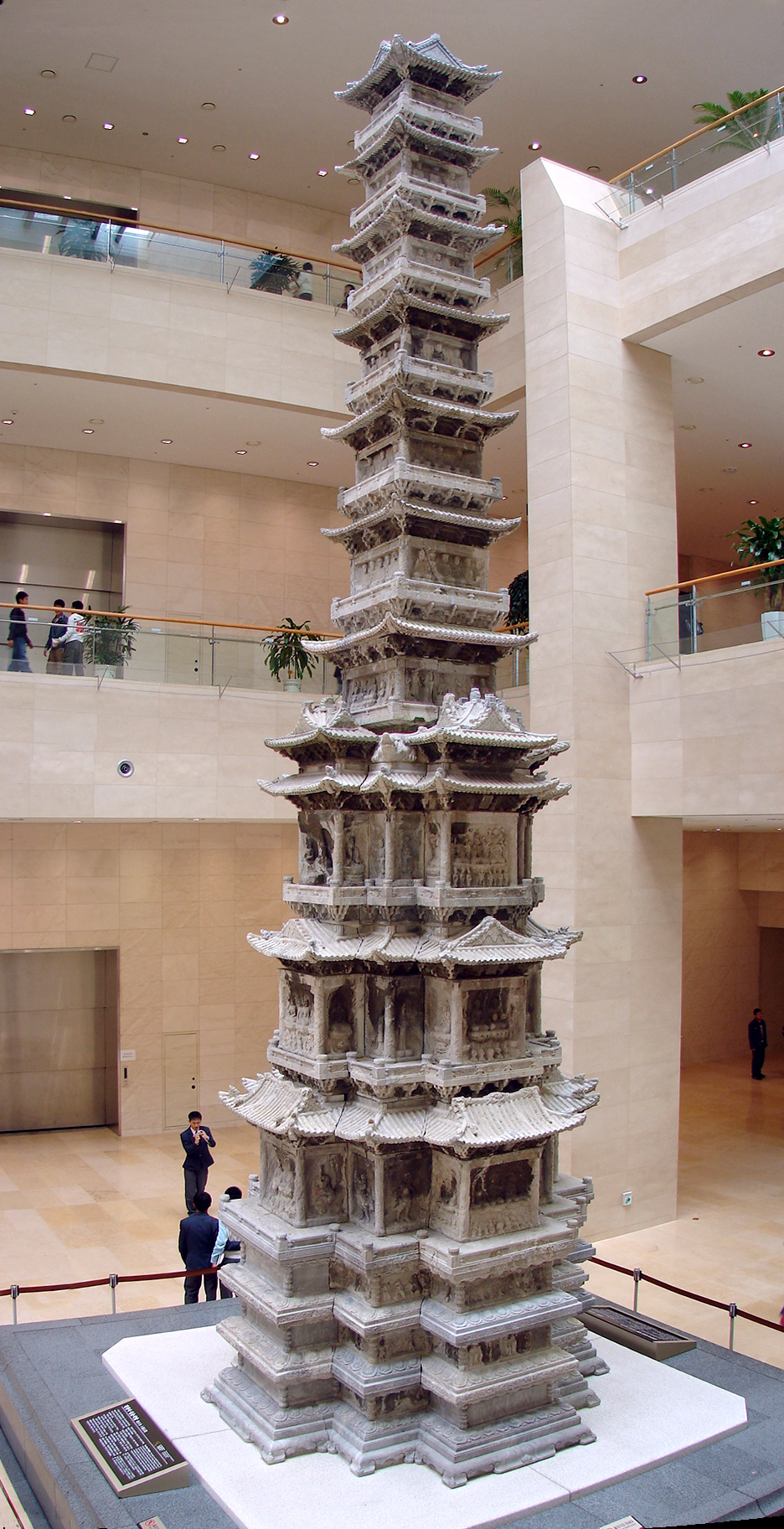
10-story-high marble pagoda of Gyeongcheonsa Temple.

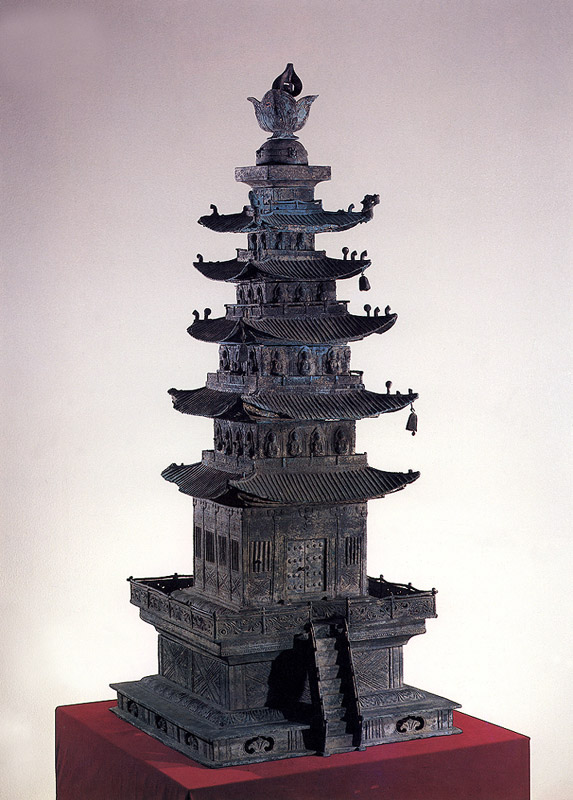
Bronze model pagoda, Goryeo period, a national treasure of Korea, Leeum Museum, Seoul, South Korea.

=== Joseon (1392–1910) ===
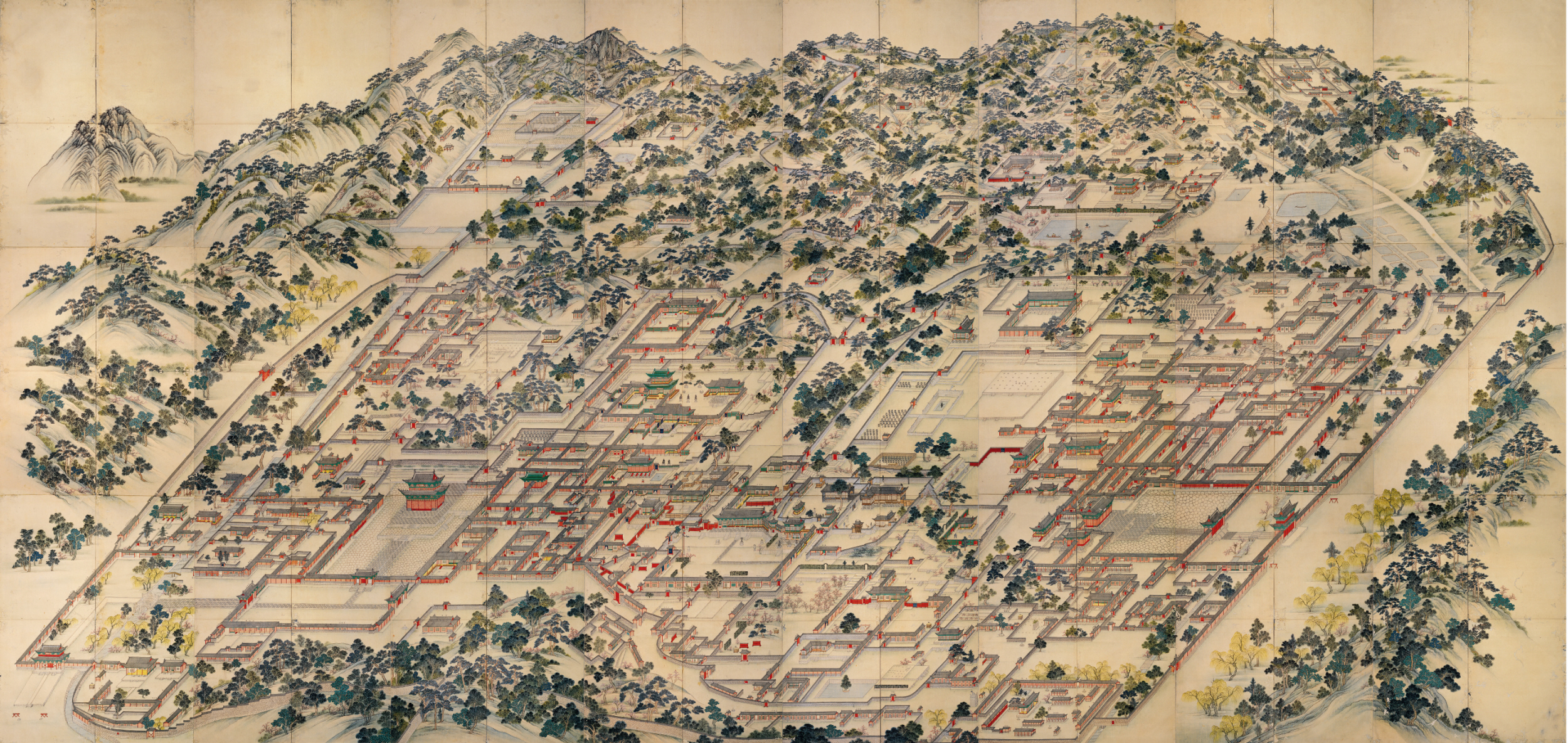
Donggwoldo, a landscape of the once extensive grounds of Changdeokgung, a UNESCO World Heritage Site, and Changgyeonggung. Painted c. 1830.

The Joseon dynasty was founded in 1392. Joseon architecture was used from the 14th century to the beginning of 20th century.

Jaesil, or clan memorial halls, became common in many villages where extended families erected facilities for common veneration of a distant ancestor. Jongmyo, or memorial shrines, were established by the government to commemorate exceptional acts of filial piety or devotion.

Seoul's stone wall, constructed in 1396 and rebuilt in 1422, was more than 18 kilometers long (16 kilometers of which remain or were restored) and had eight gates (including Namdaemun, the South Gate); Suwon's town wall was completed in 1796.

==== Fortress architecture ====
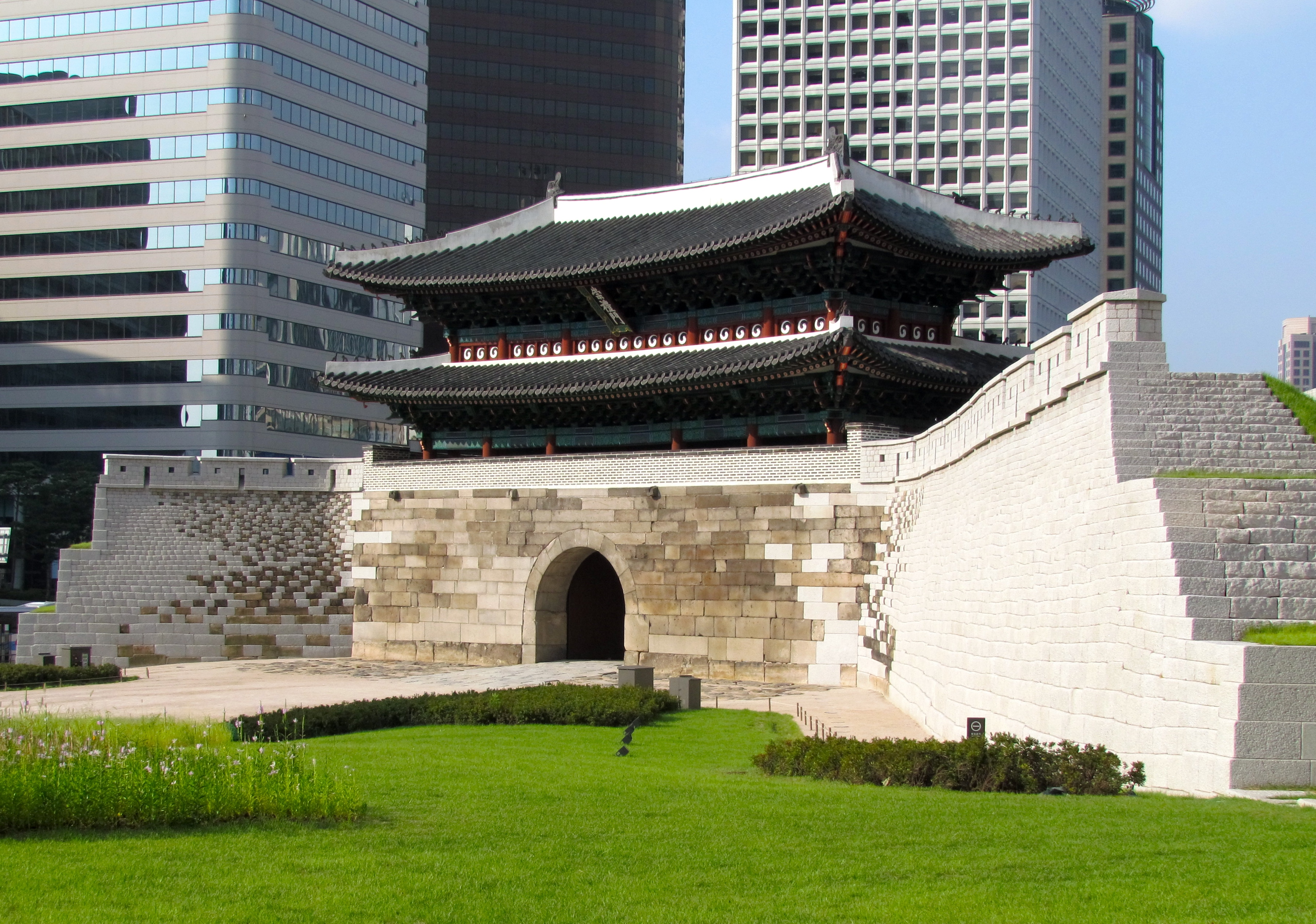
Namdaemun Gate, one of the Eight Gates in the Fortress Wall of Seoul.

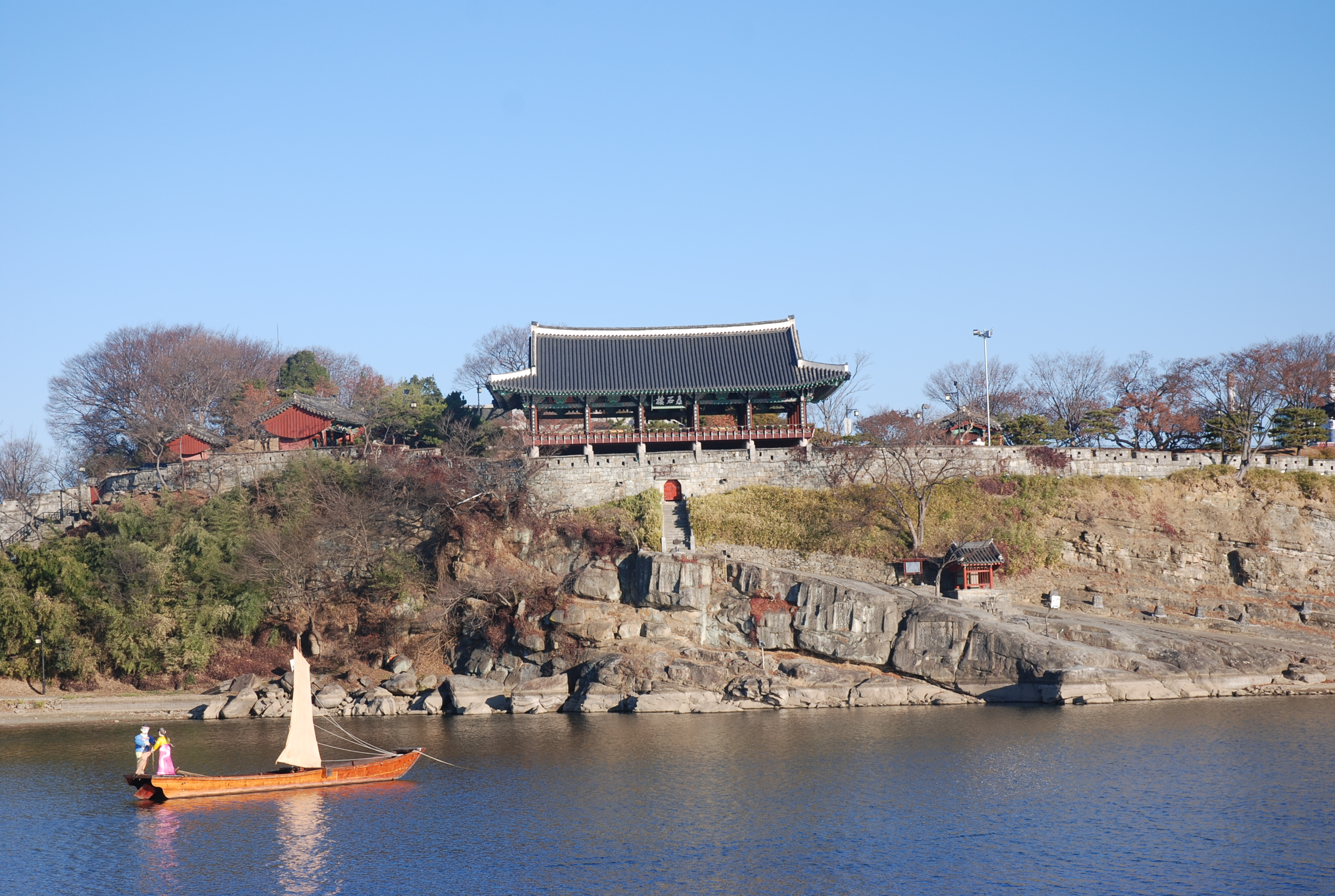
Chokseok pavilion, Jinju fortress wall.

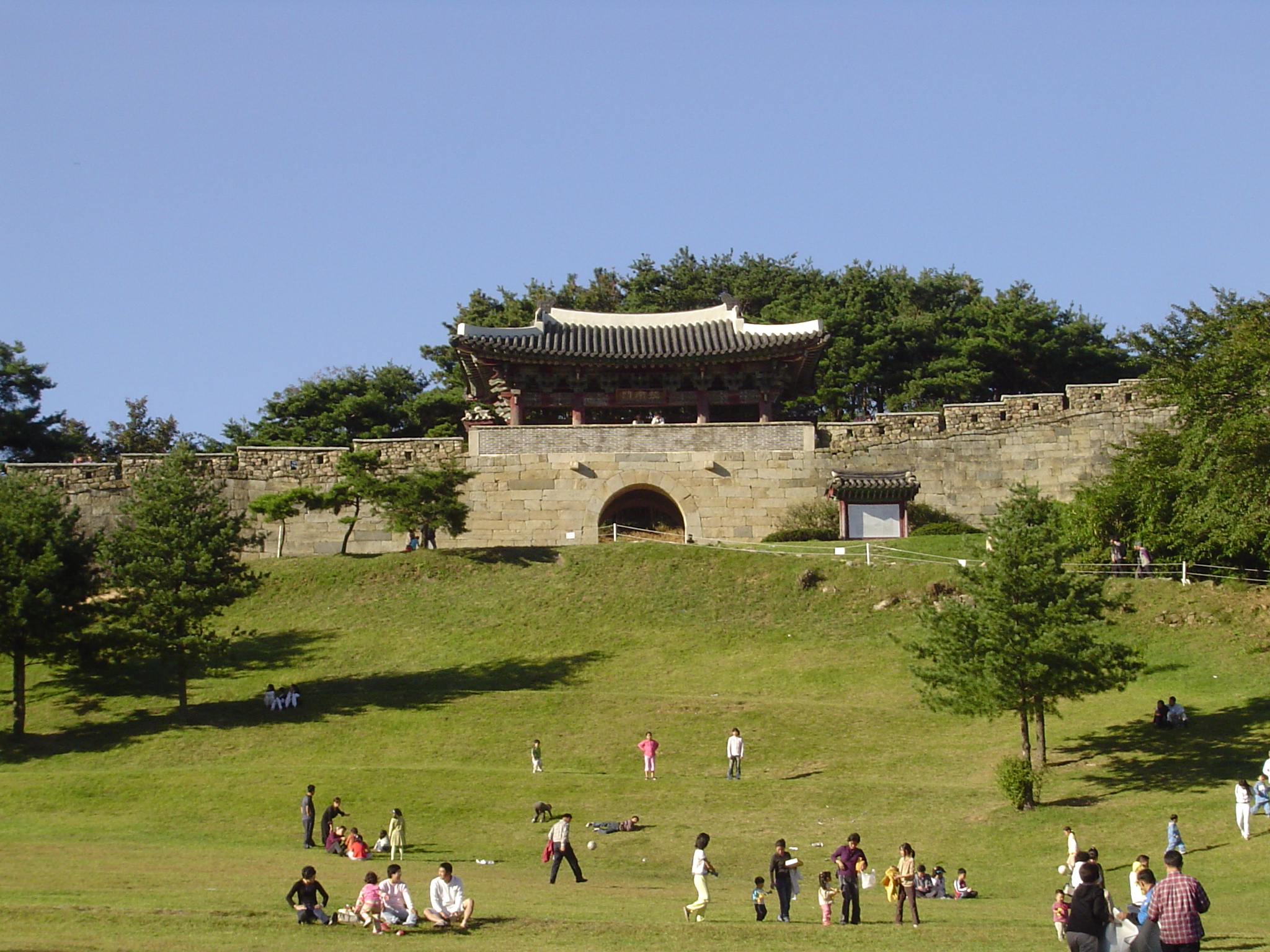
Sangdang Mountain Fortress in Cheongju.

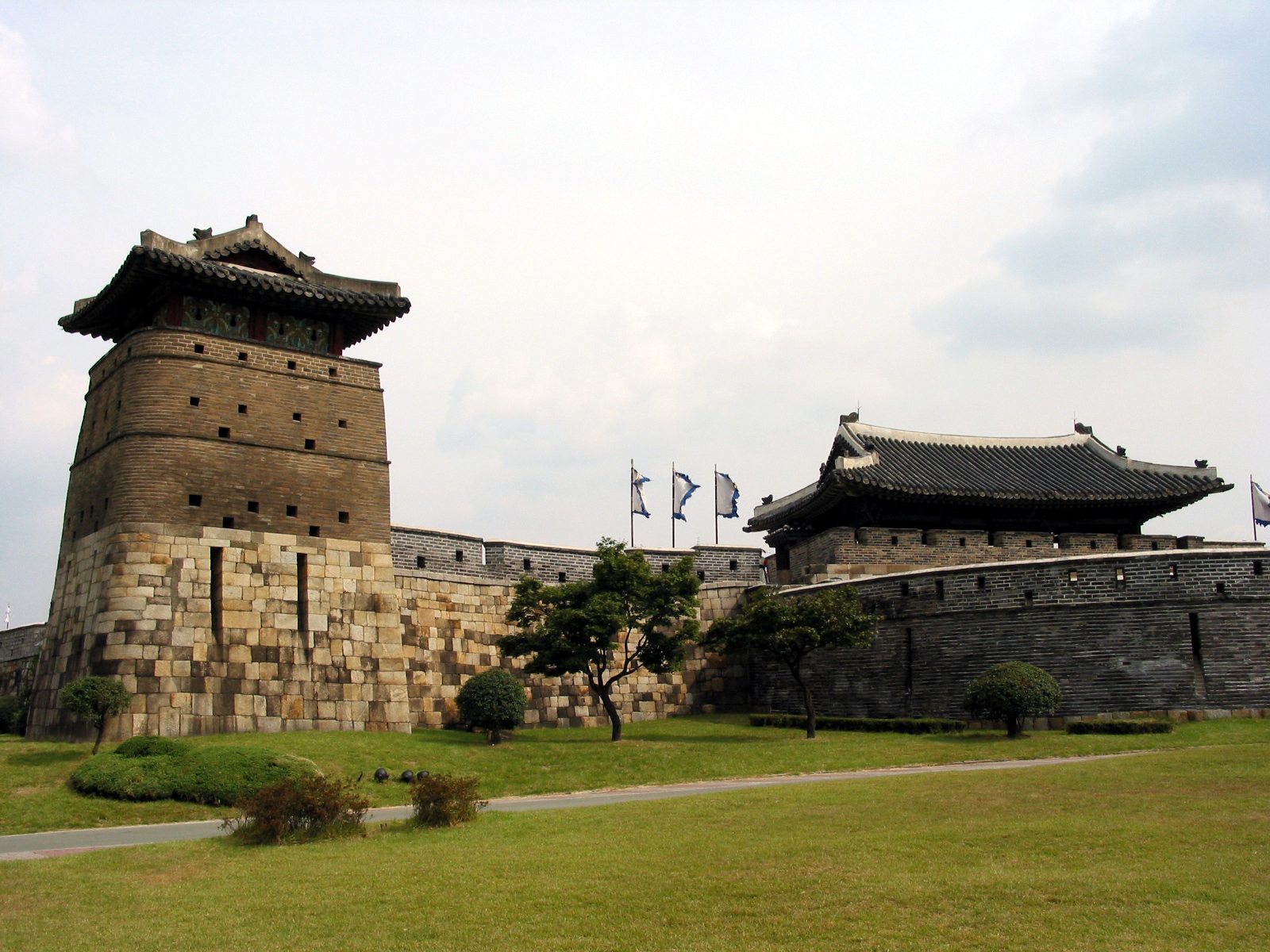
Hwaseong Fortress, a UNESCO World Heritage Site.

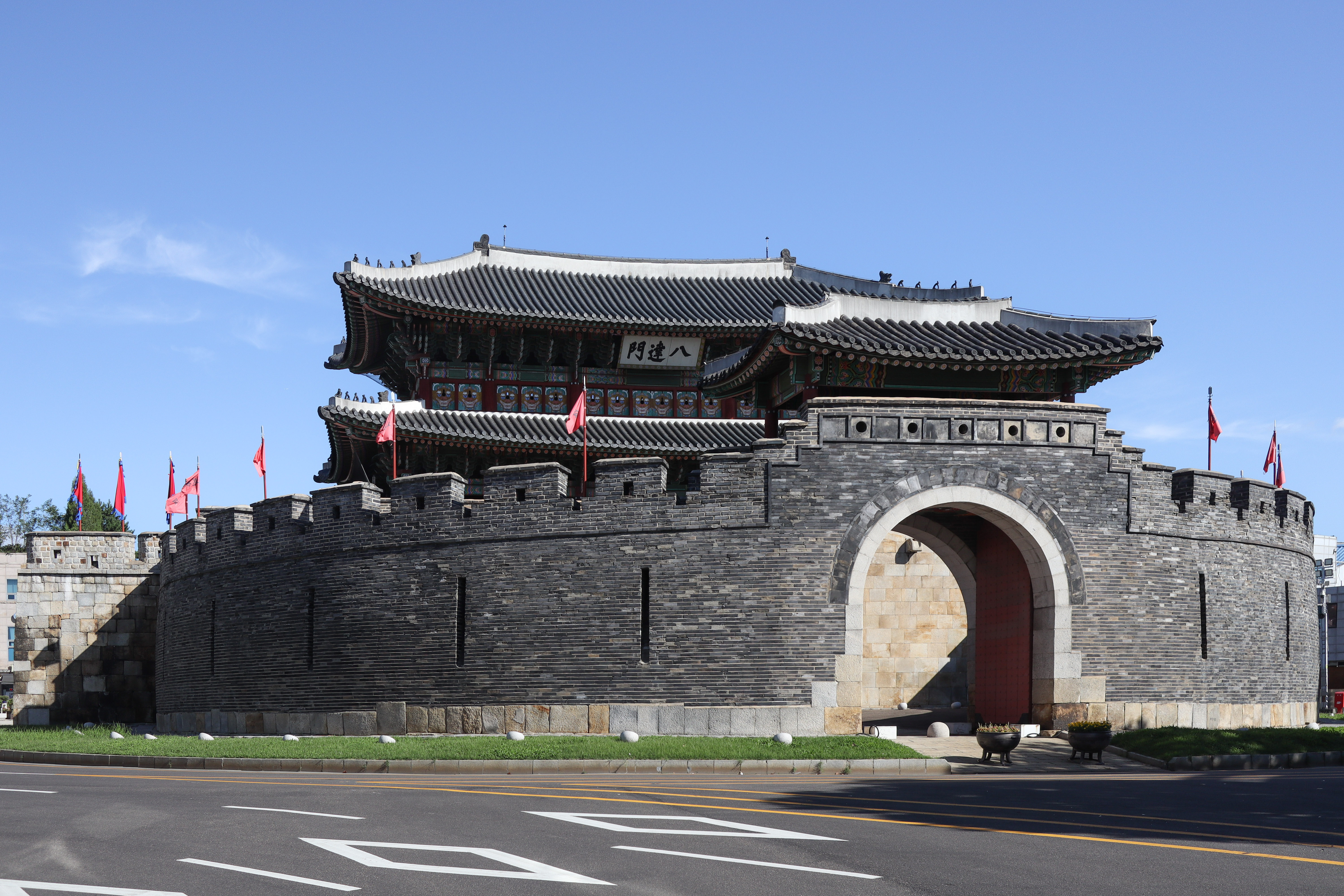
South gate, Hwaseong Fortress

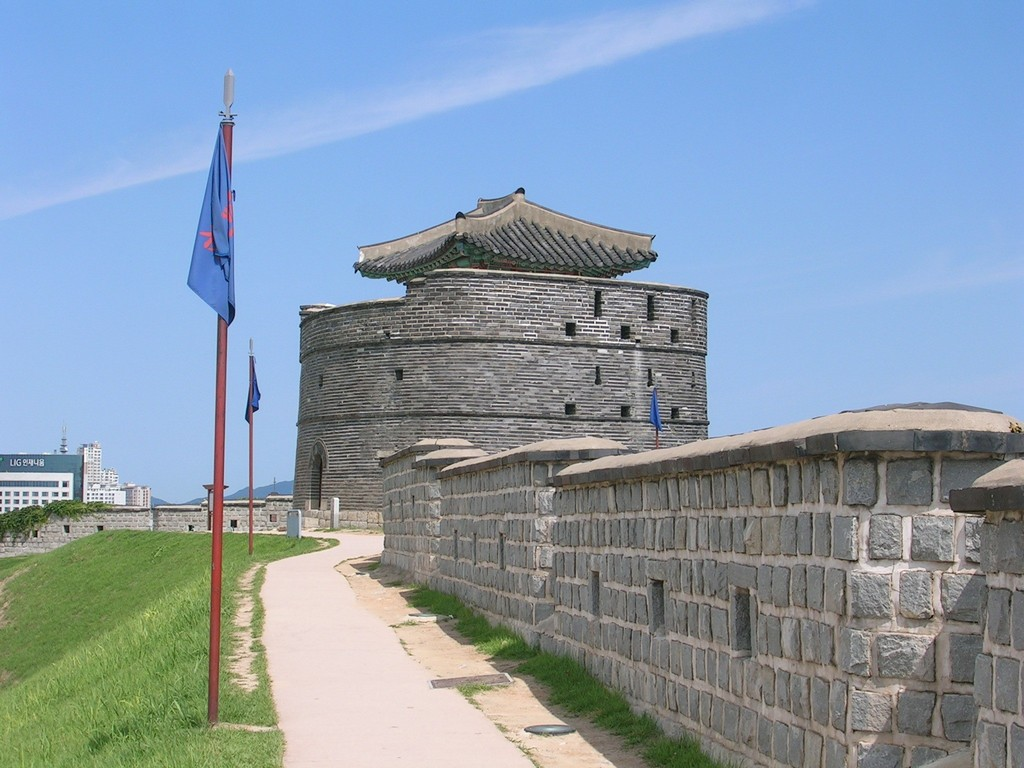
Watch tower, Hwaseong Fortress.

==== Religious architecture ====
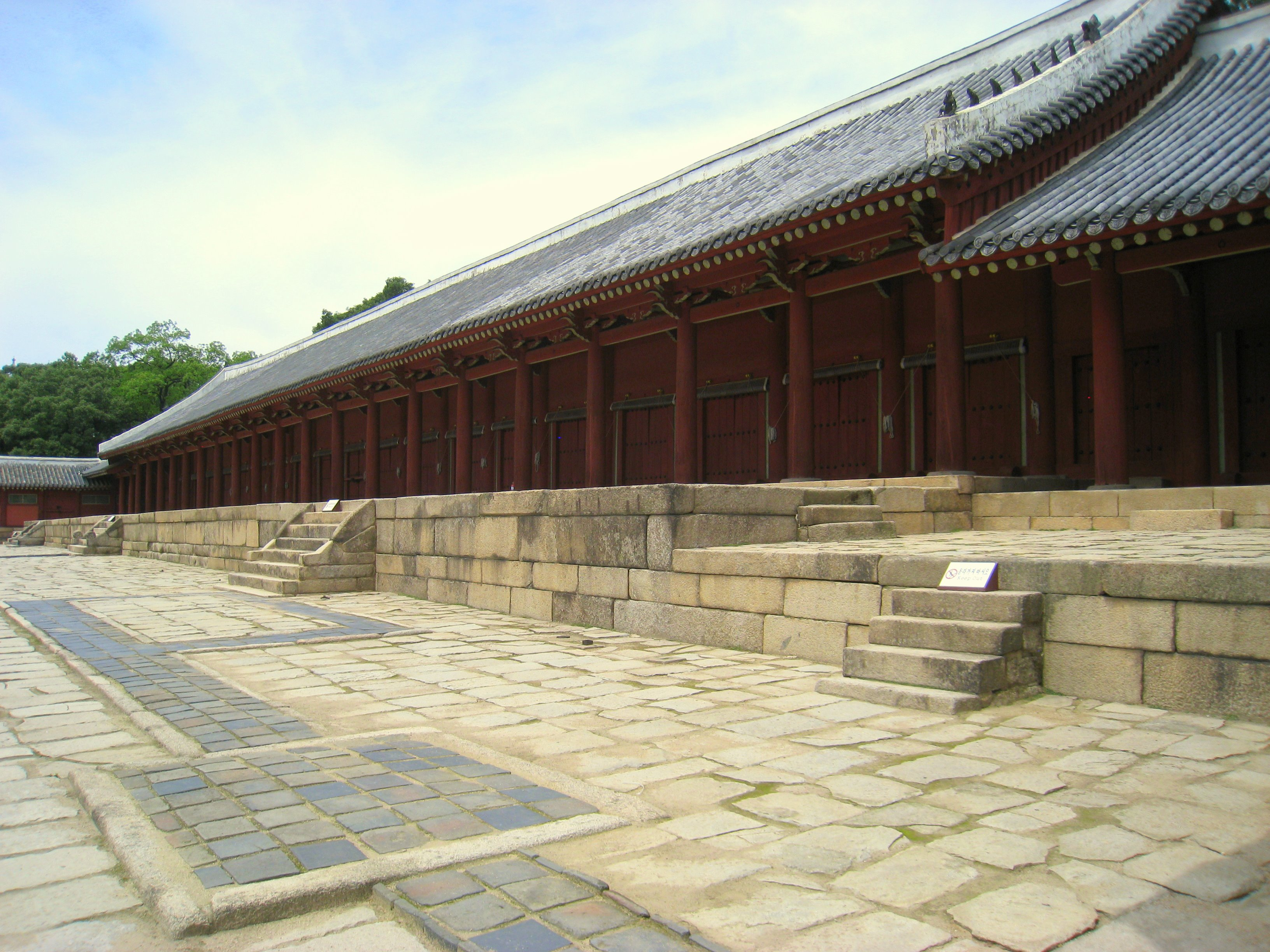
Jongmyo, a UNESCO World Heritage site. This Confucian shrine is dedicated to the ancestors of the Joseon dynasty kings.

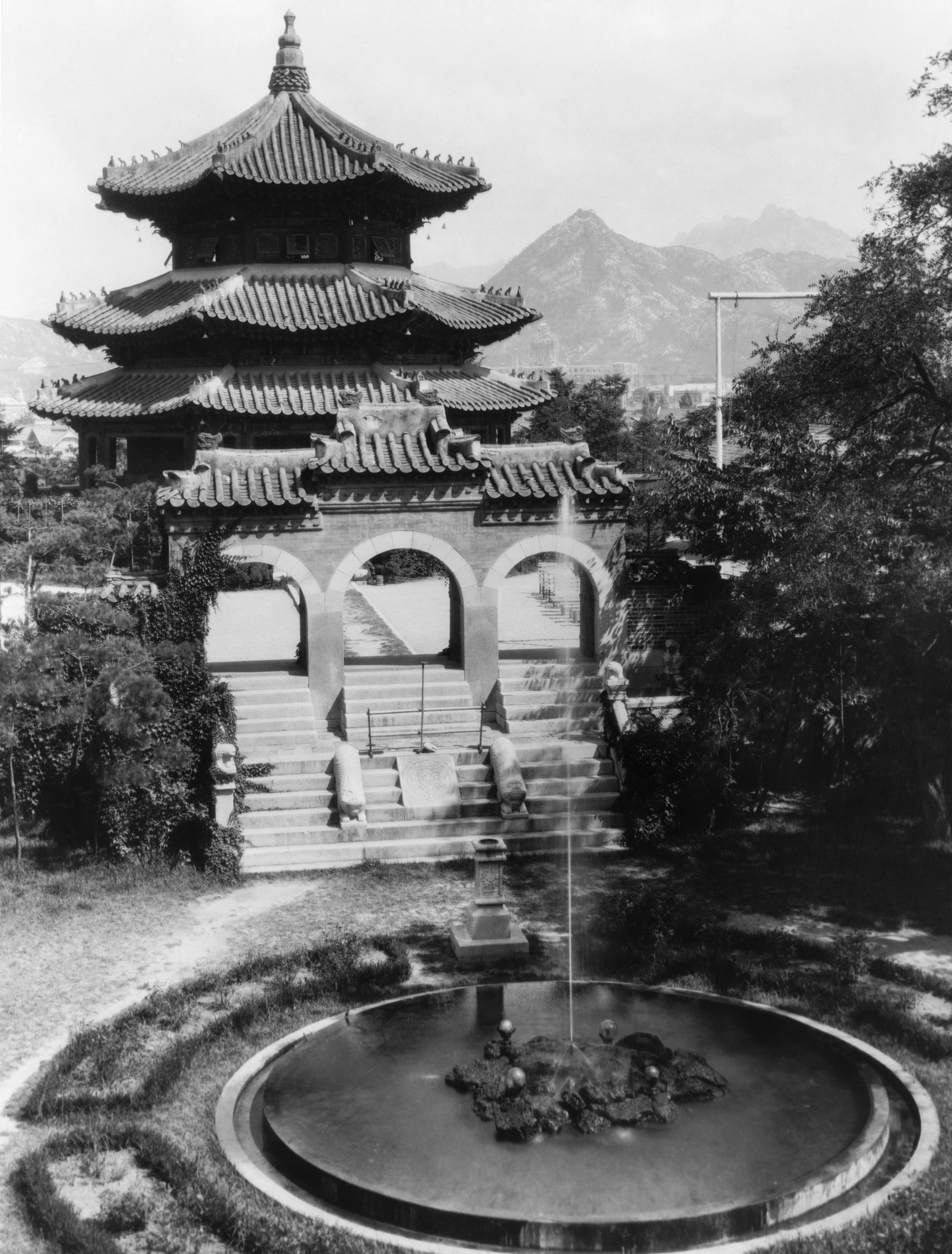
Temple of Heaven, a site where Korean Emperors performed the rites to Heaven.

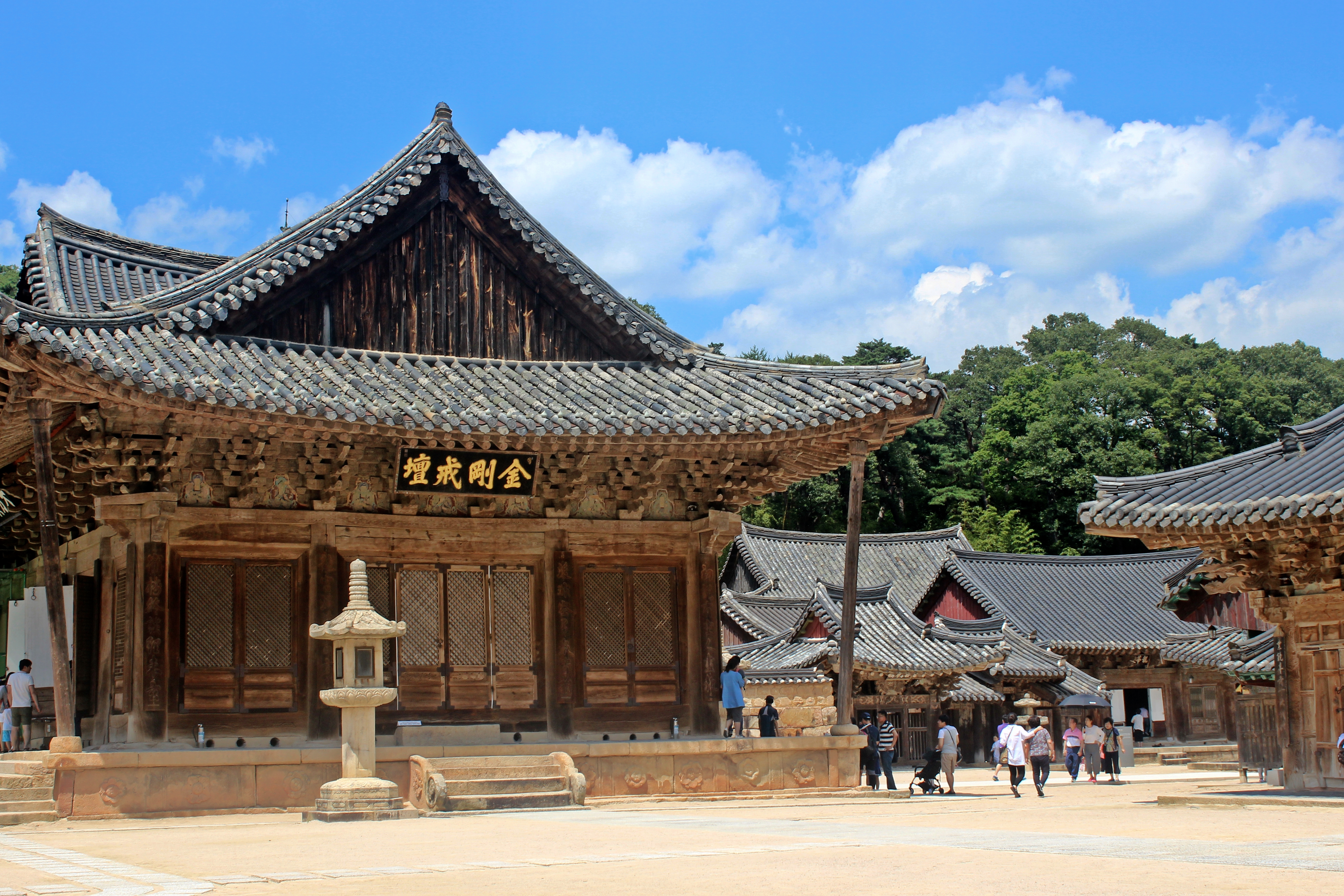
Daeungjeon Hall of Tongdosa Temple rebuilt in 1645, a national treasure of Korea. A Buddhist temple.

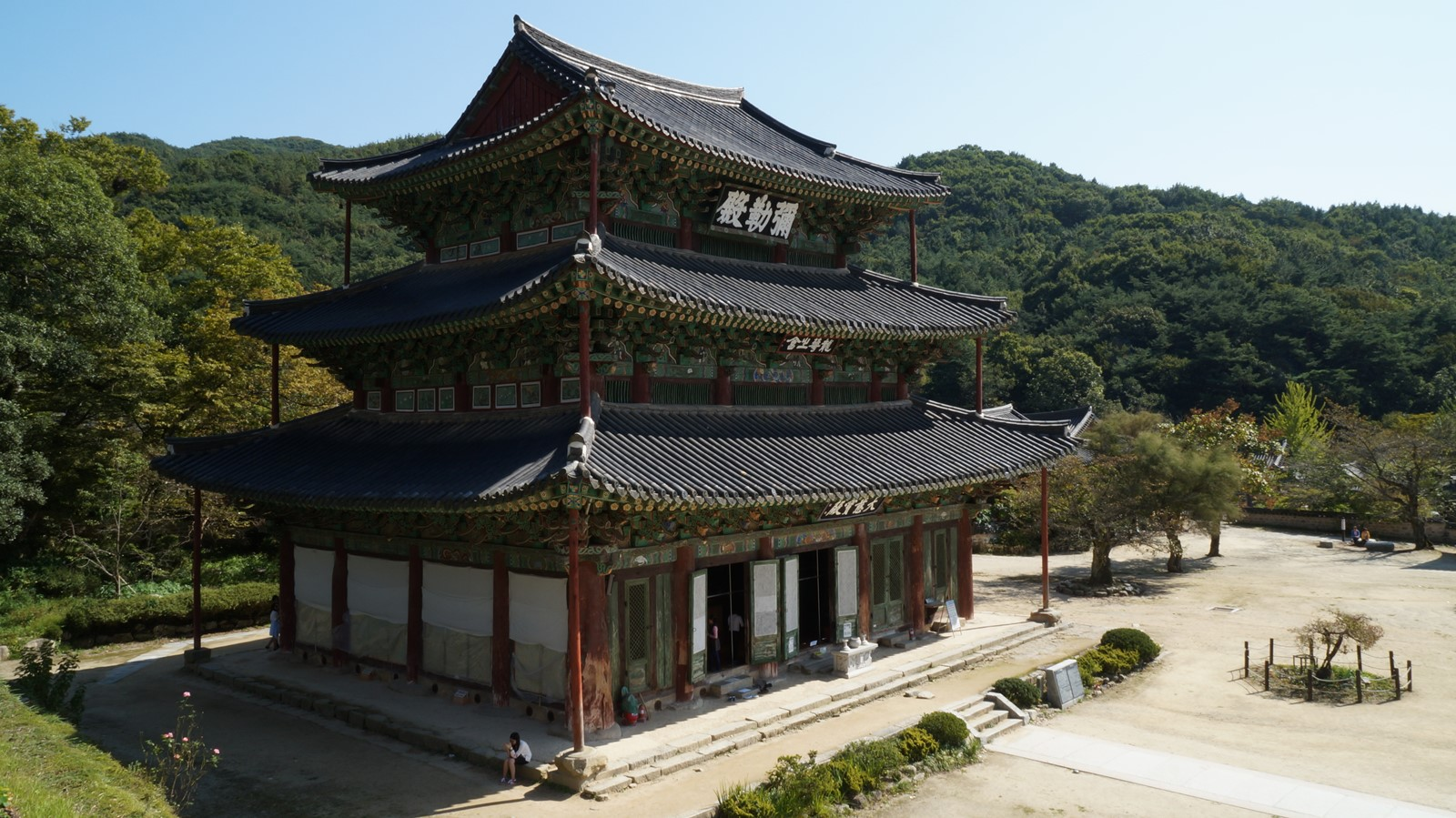
Mireukjeon or Maitreya Hall of Geumsansa Temple, a rare three-tiered structure. A Buddhist temple.

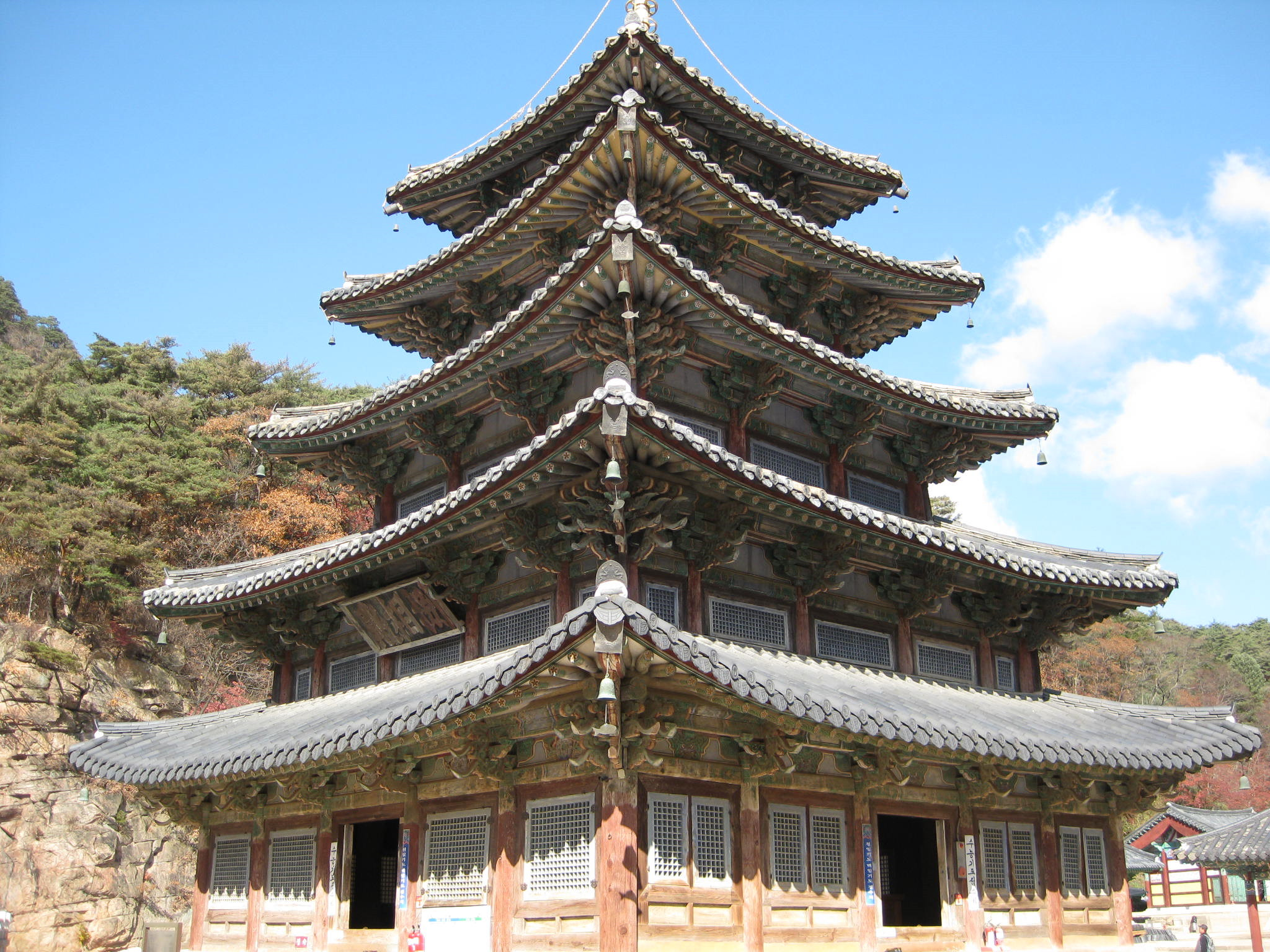
Rare wooden pagoda on the grounds of Beopjusa Temple. A Buddhist temple.

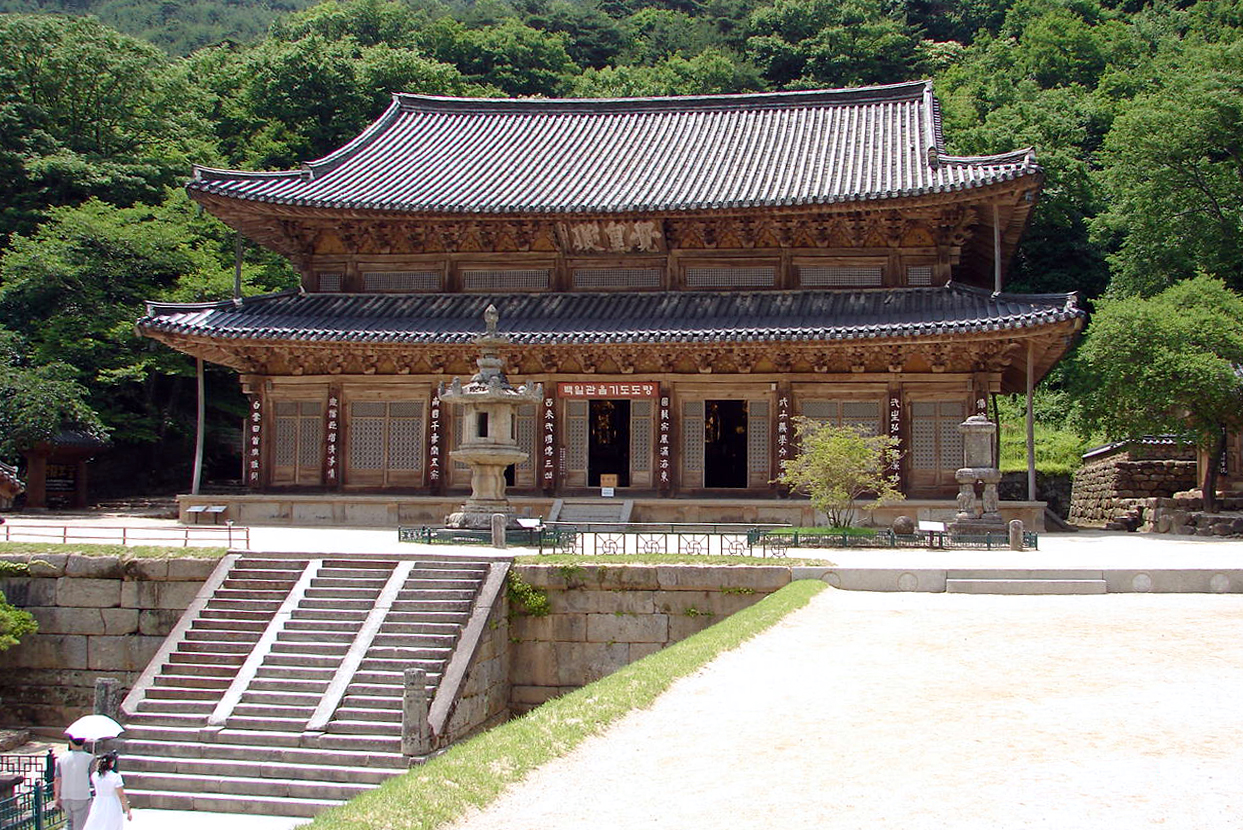
Gakhwangjeon Hall of the Buddhist temple Hwaeomsa.

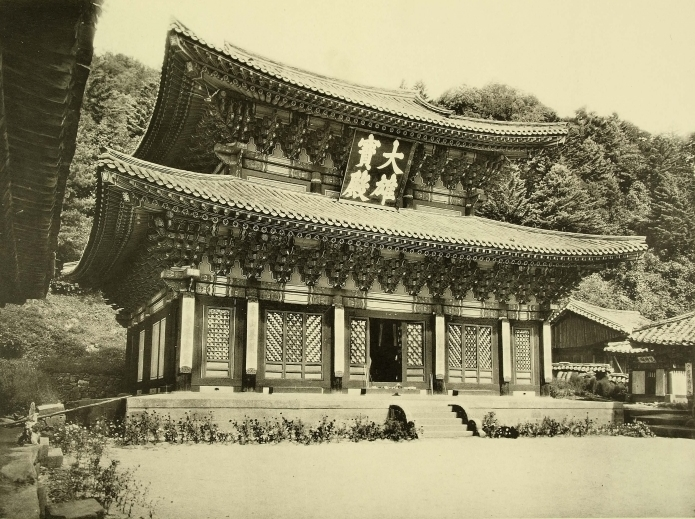
Daeungbojeon Hall of Jangansa Temple.

==== Royal architecture ====
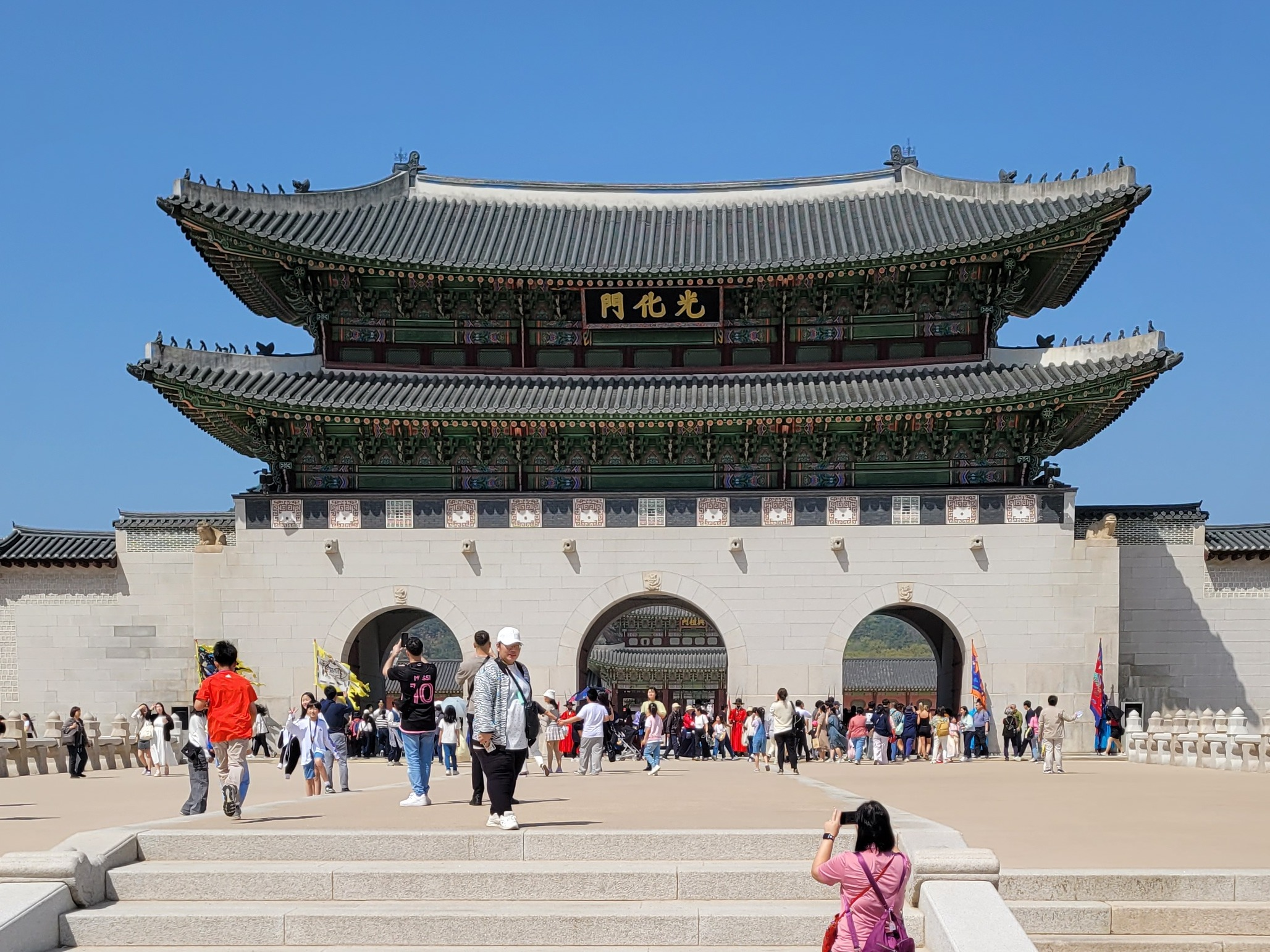
Gwanghwamun, the main gate of Gyeongbokgung.

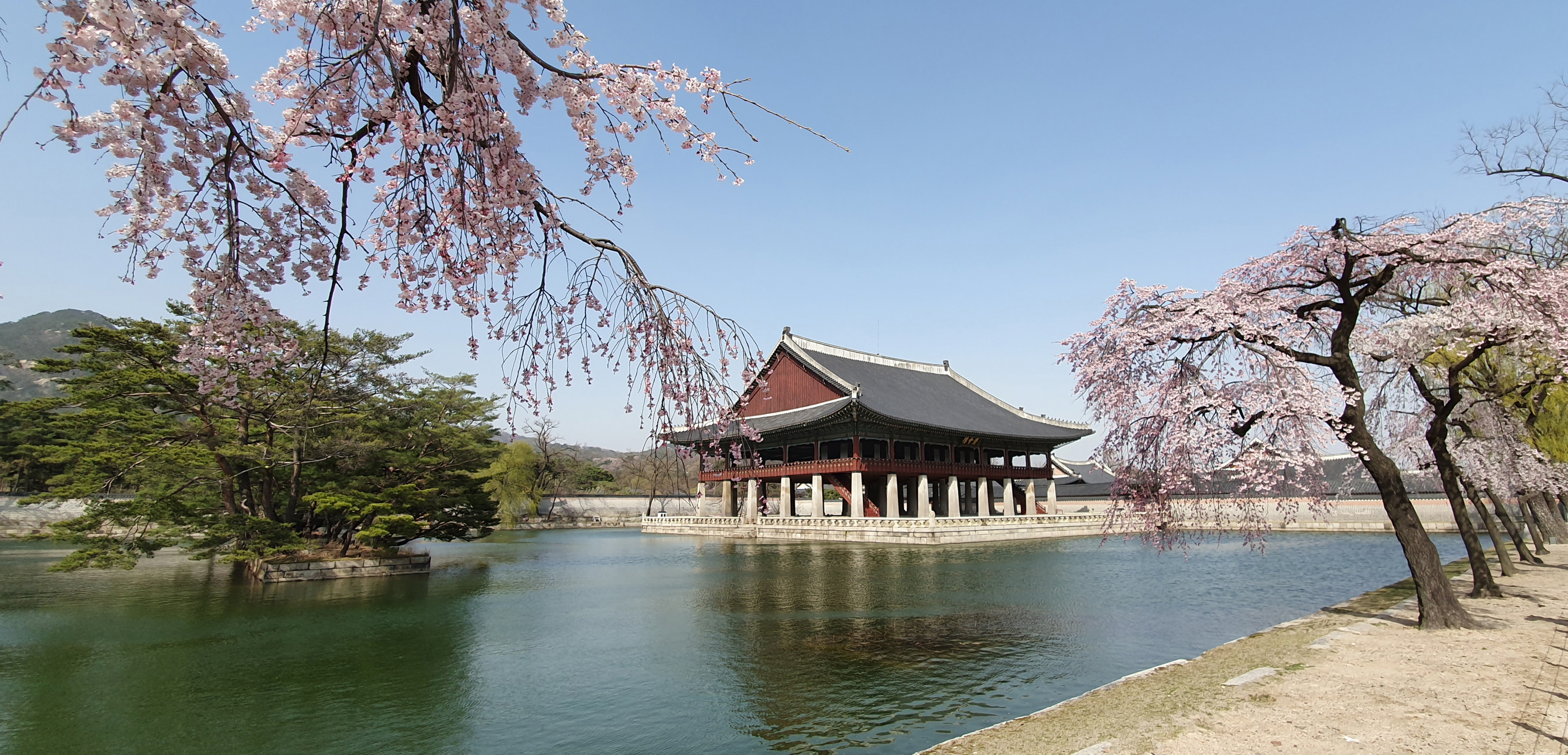
Gyeonghoeru, a royal banquet pavilion of Gyeongbokgung Palace.

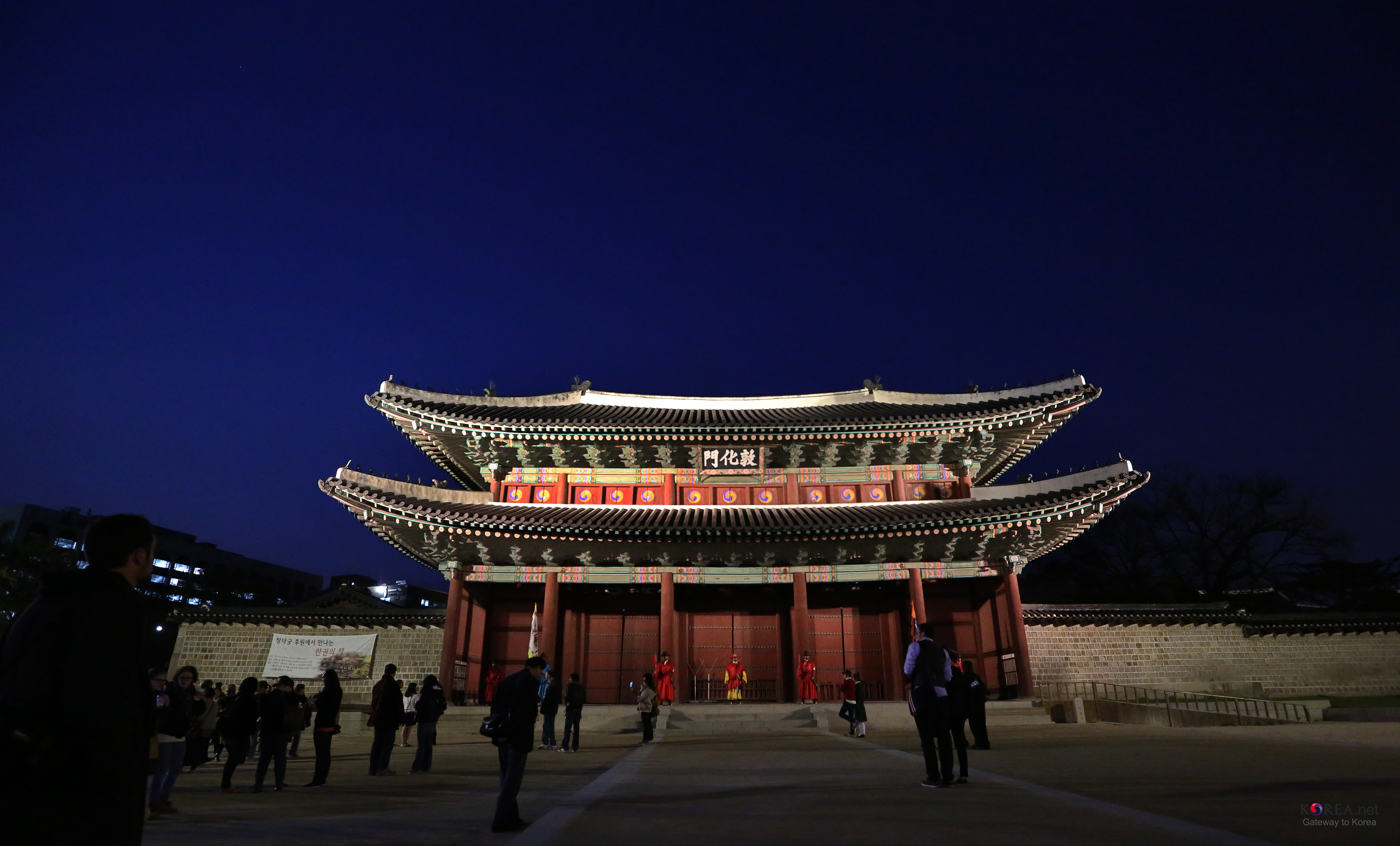
Donhwamun, the main gate of Changdeokgung, rebuilt 1609.

Injeongjeon Hall, the throne hall of Changdeokgung Palace, a UNESCO World Heritage Site.

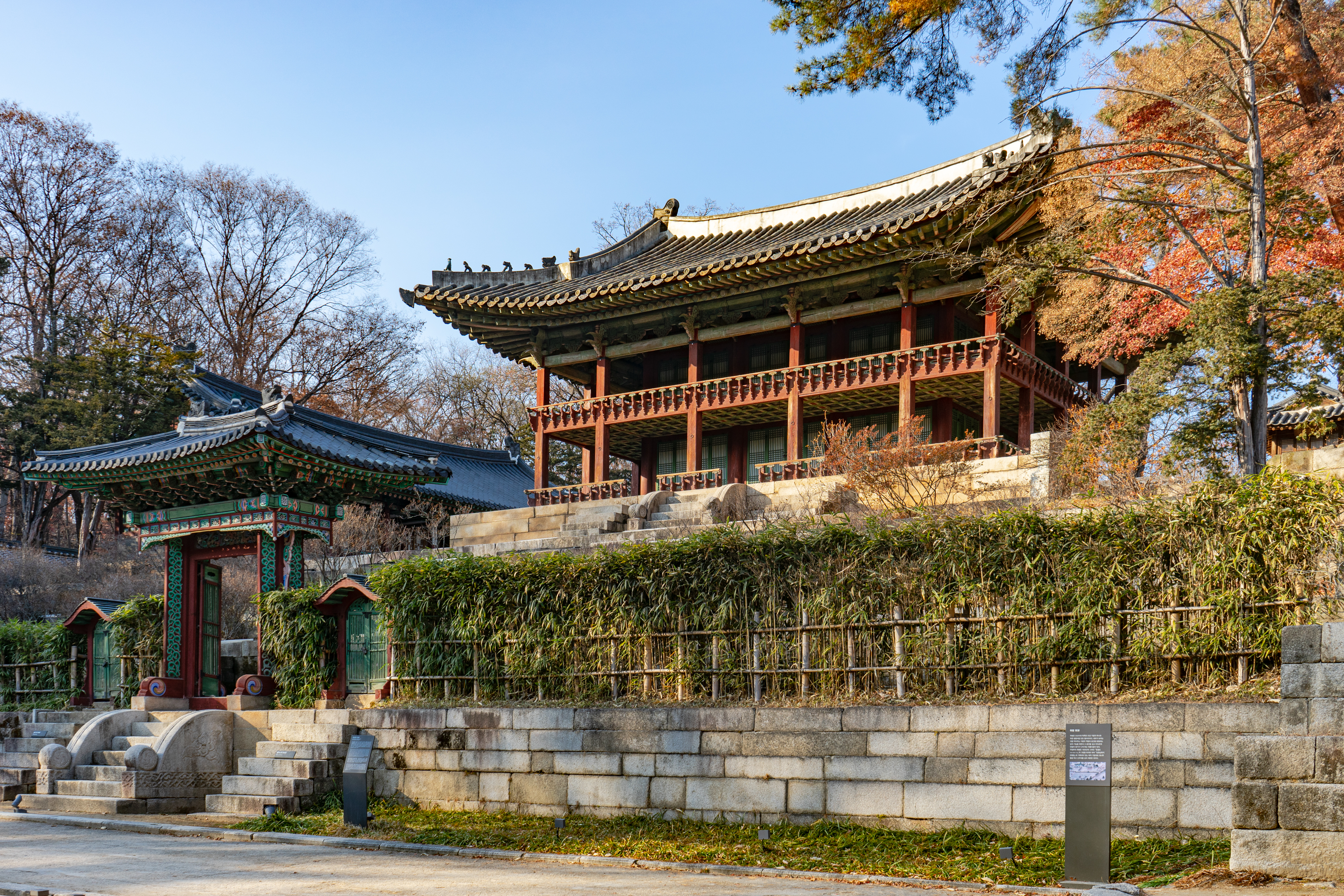
Royal Library in the grounds of the Secret Garden in Changdeokgung Palace.

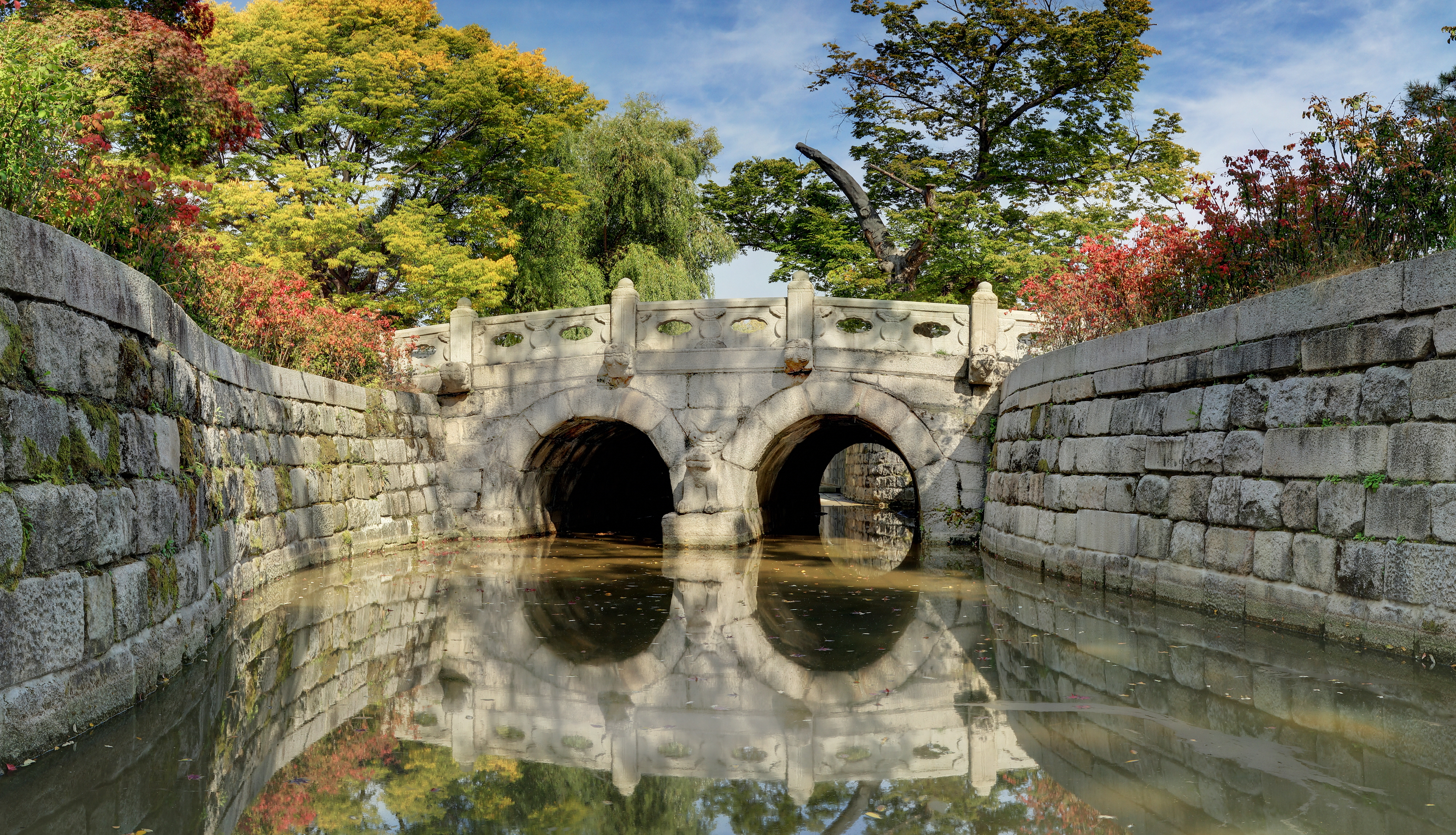
Granite bridge, Changdeokgung Palace.

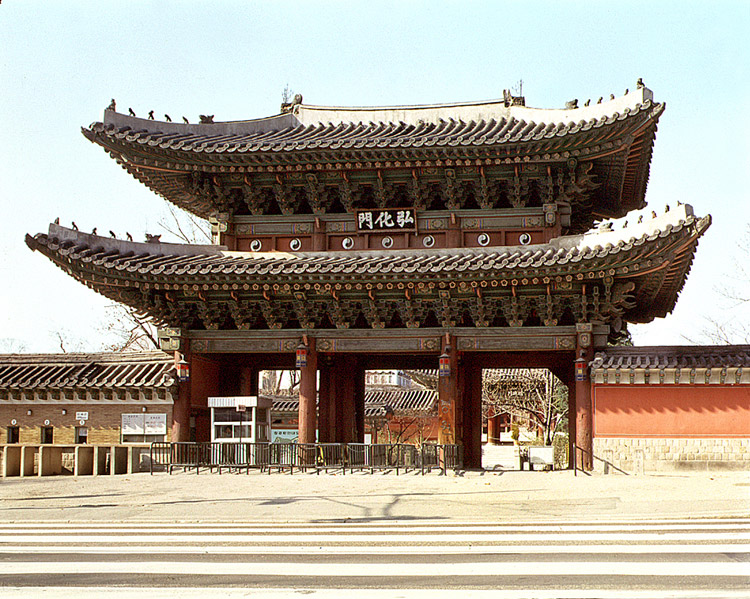
Honghwa Gate, Changgyeonggung. Rebuilt in 1616, it is one of the oldest surviving wooden gates in Korea.

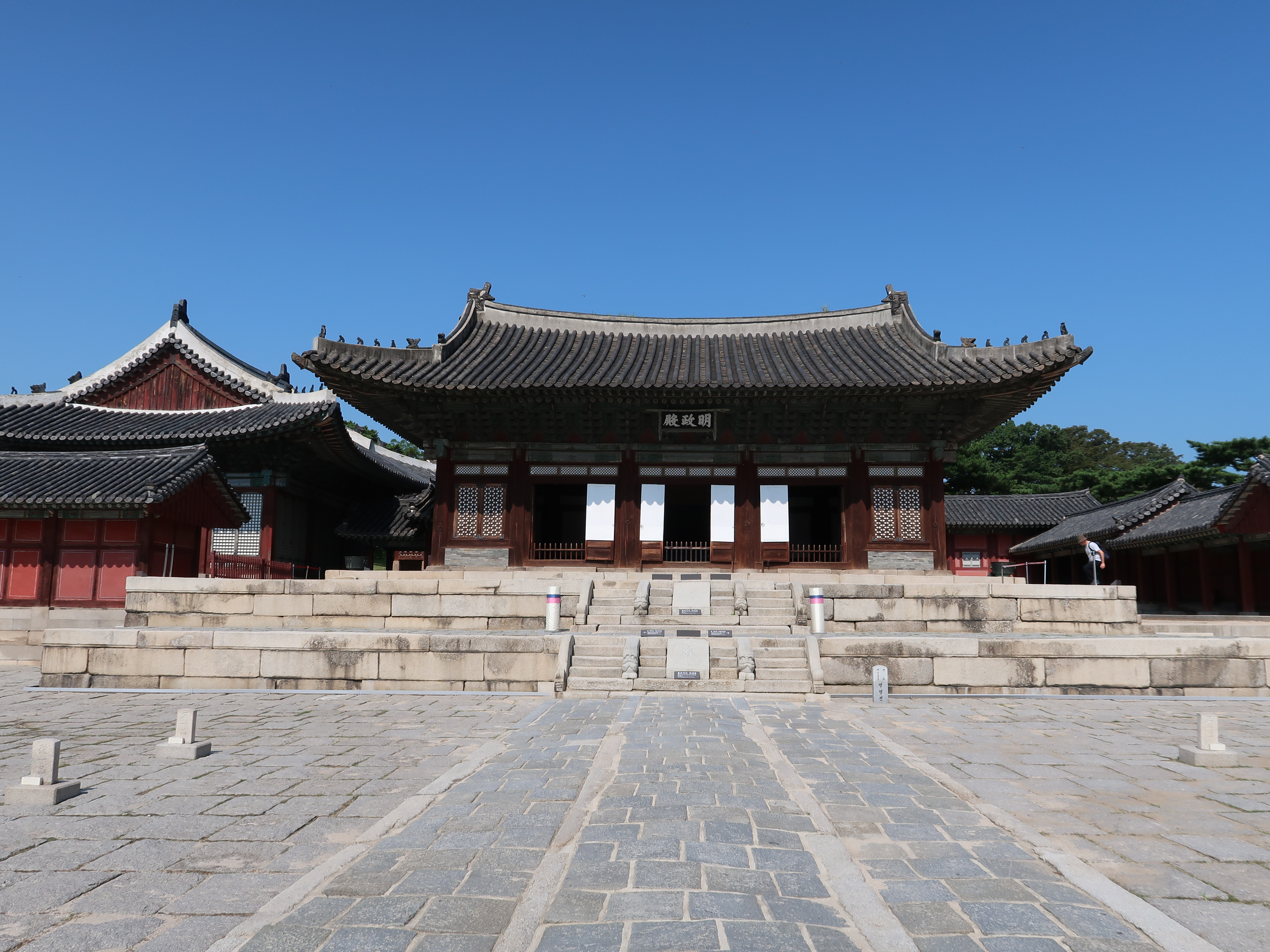
Myeongjeongjeon, the throne hall of Changgyeonggung Palace.

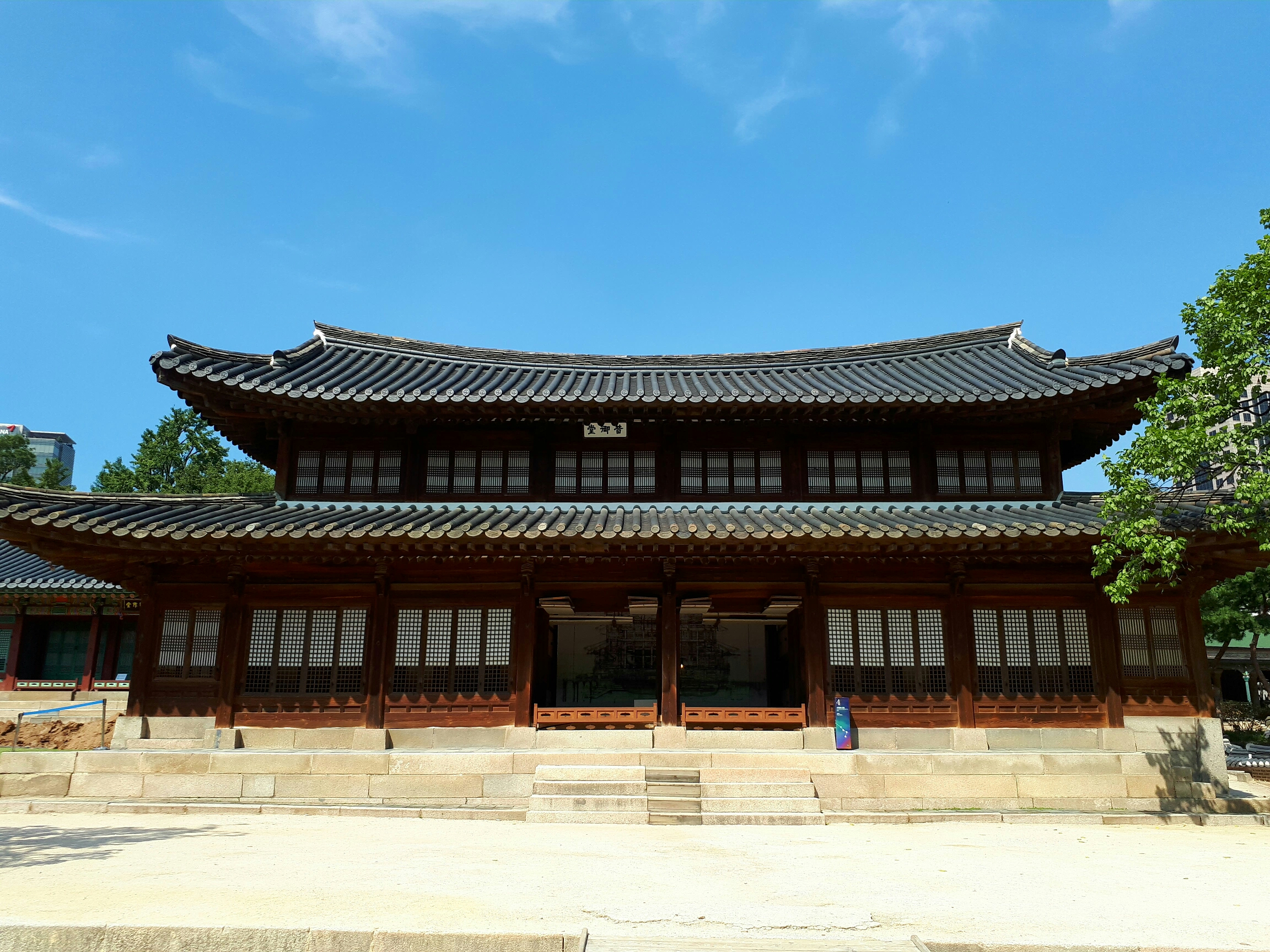
Seokeodang, two-story building of Deoksugung built in the style of a private residence.

==== Urban architecture ====
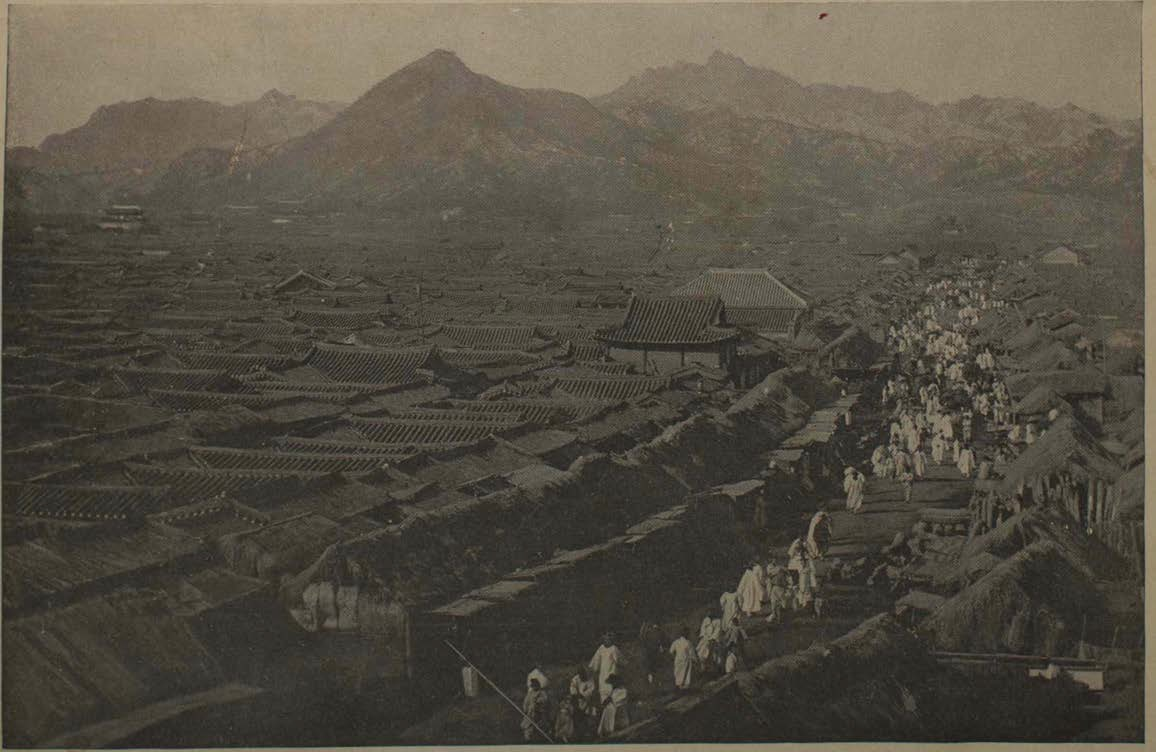
Seoul in 1894.

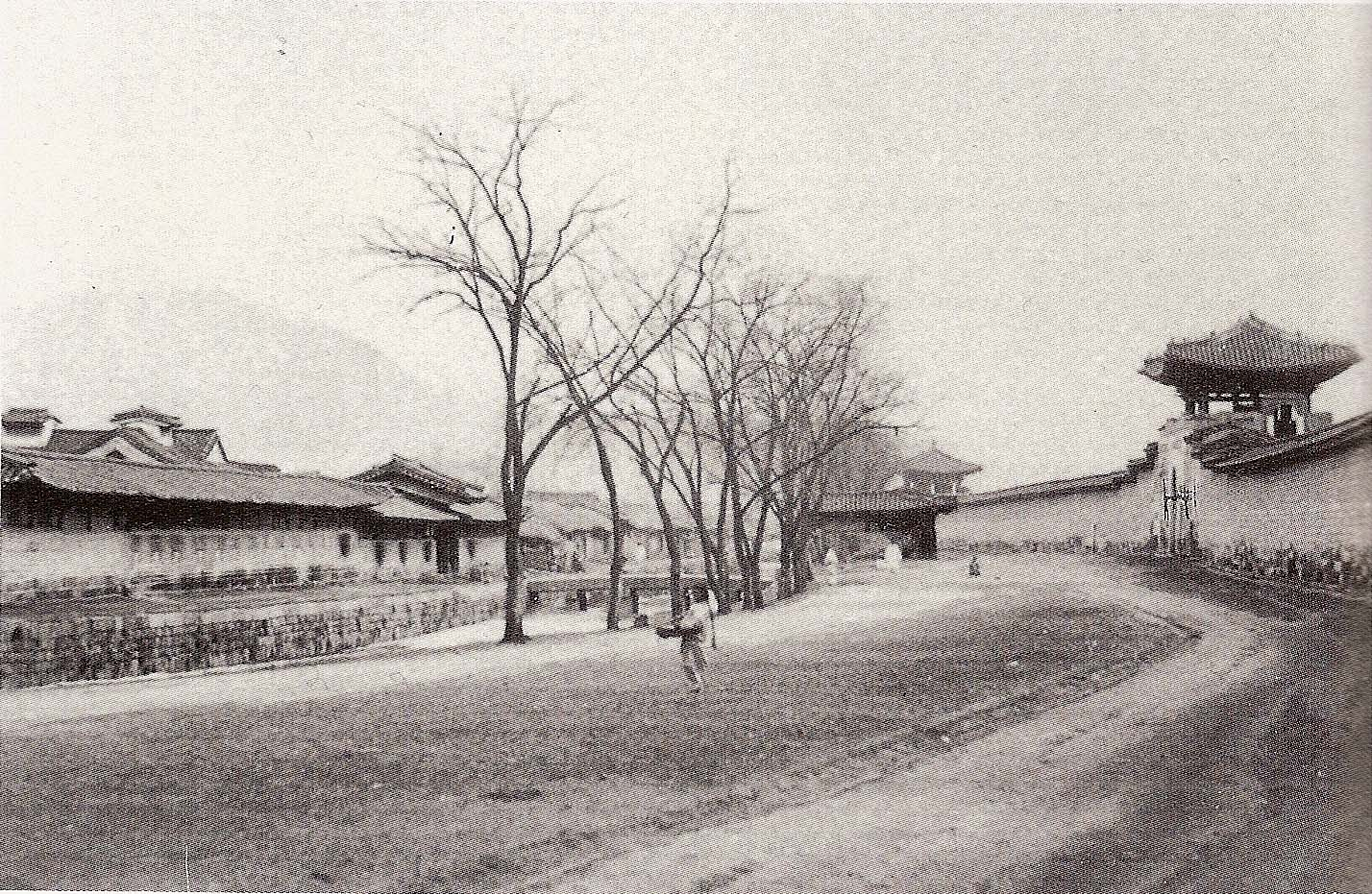
Waryong-dong, Seoul in the late Joseon period.

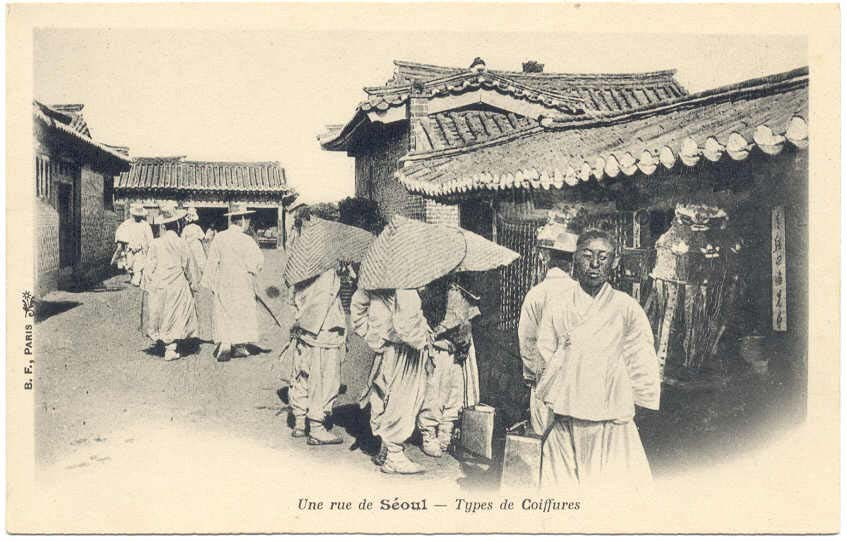
A narrow street of 19c Seoul.

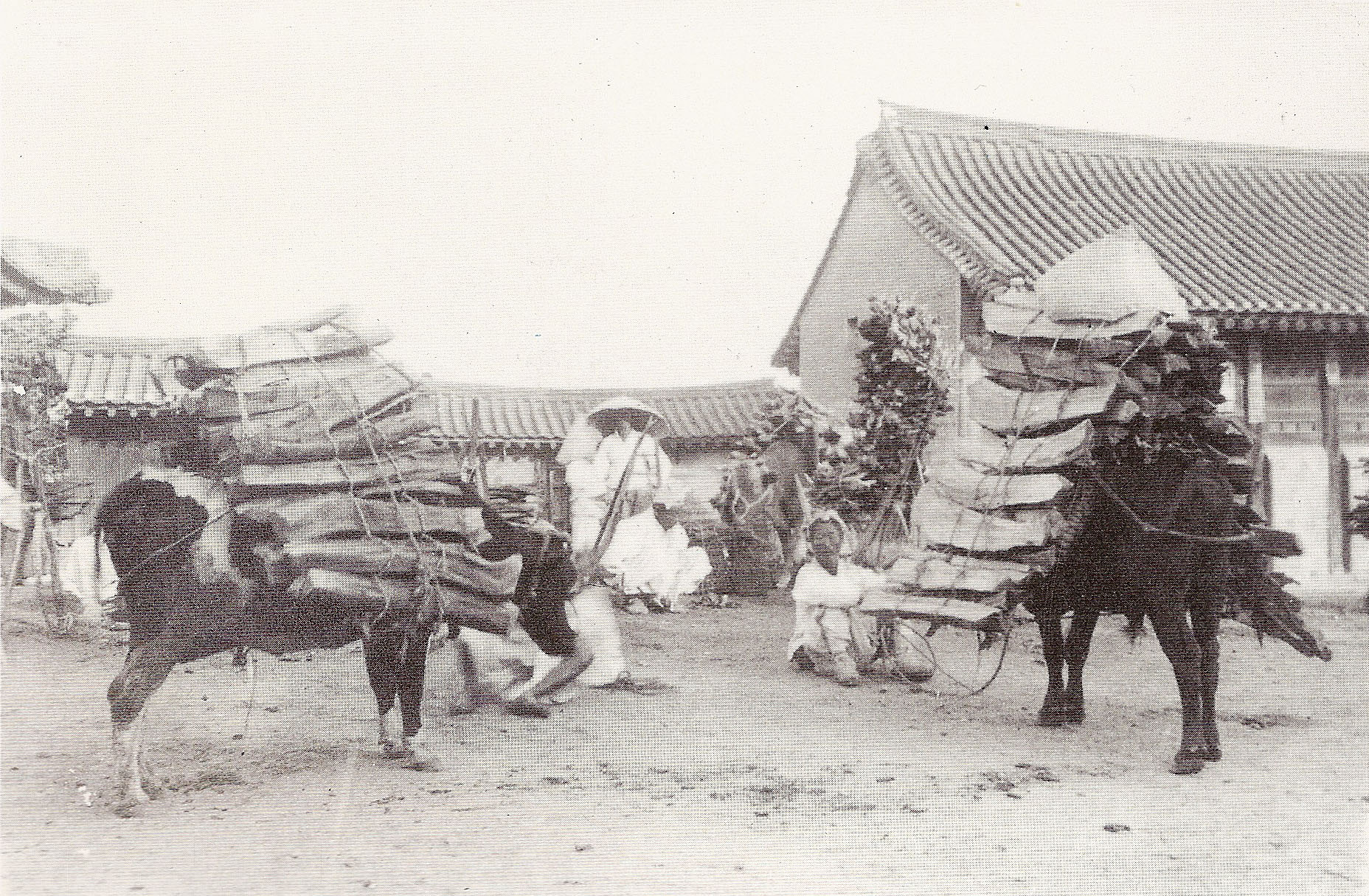
A street of 19c Seoul.

==== Vernacular architecture ====
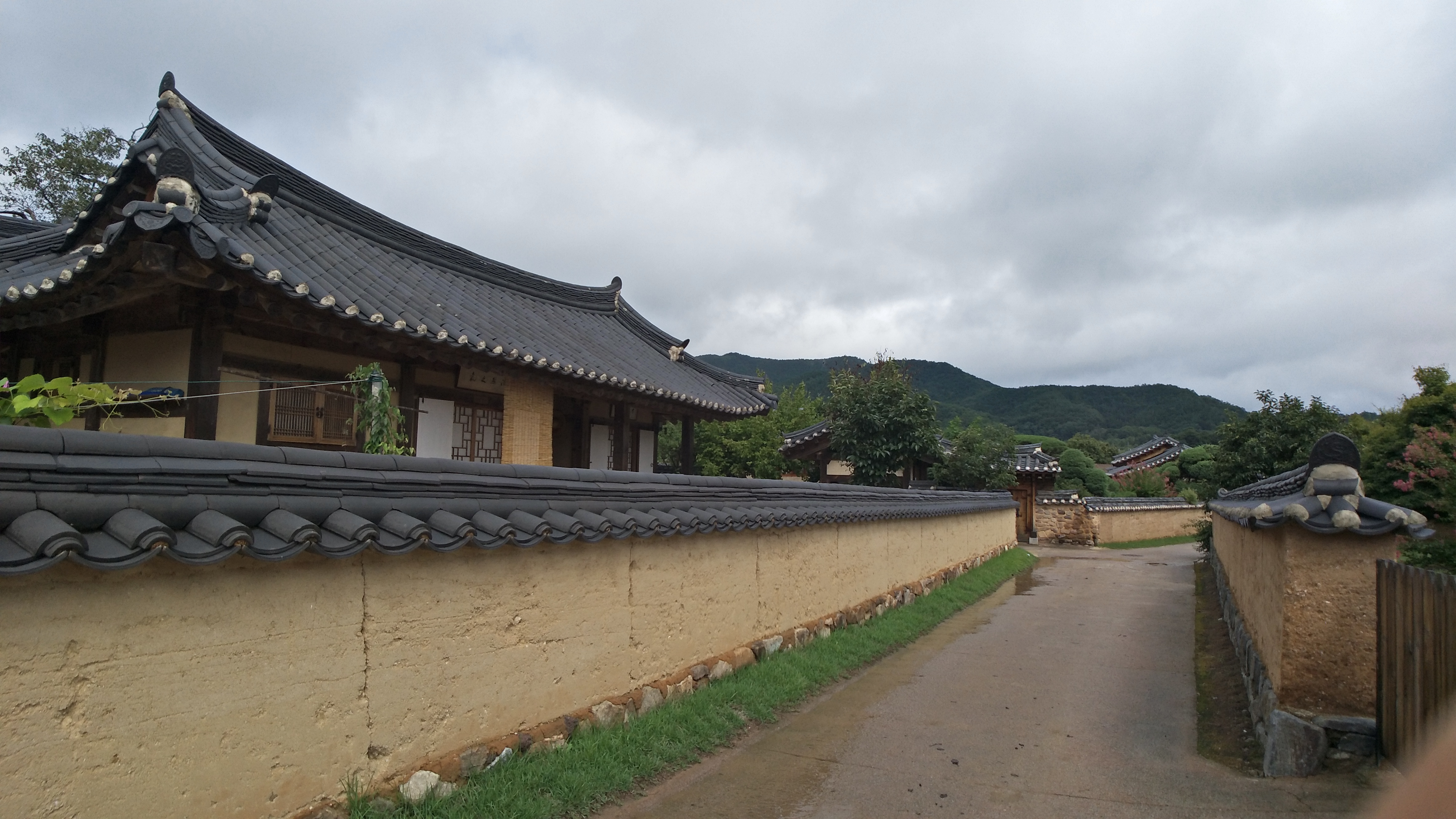
Hahoe Folk Village, a UNESCO World Heritage Site.

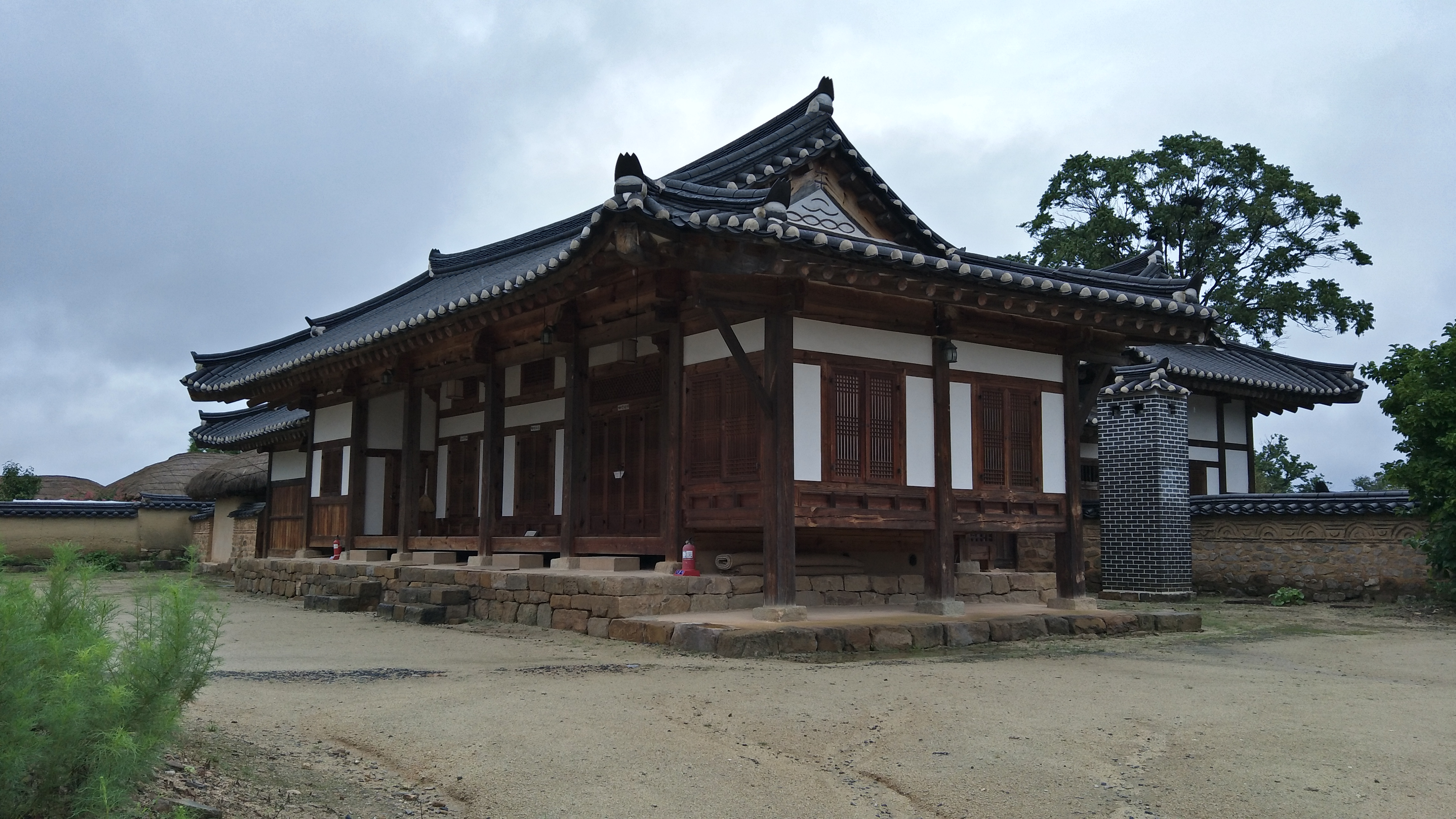
Hahoe Folk Village

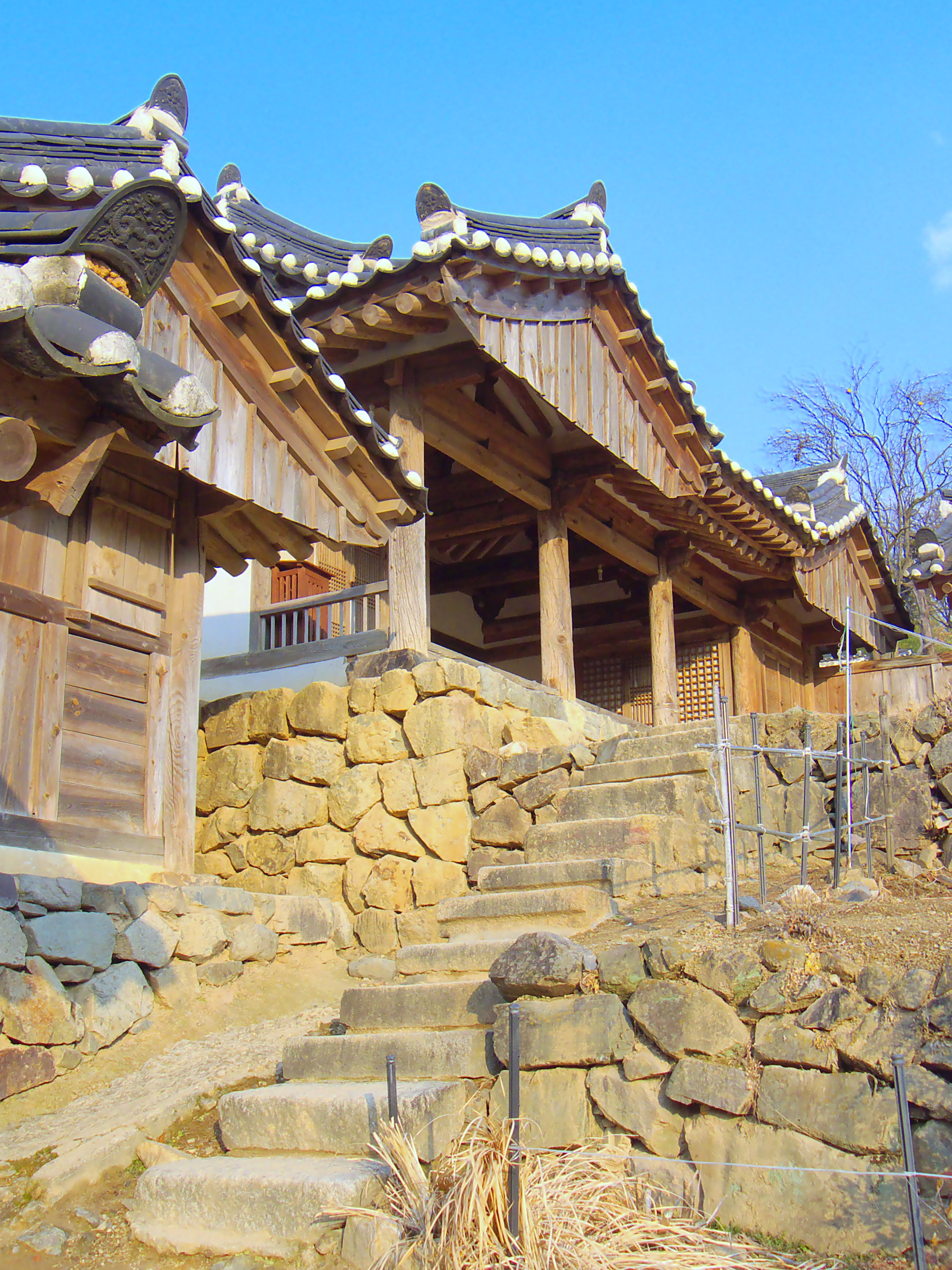
Yangdong Folk Village.

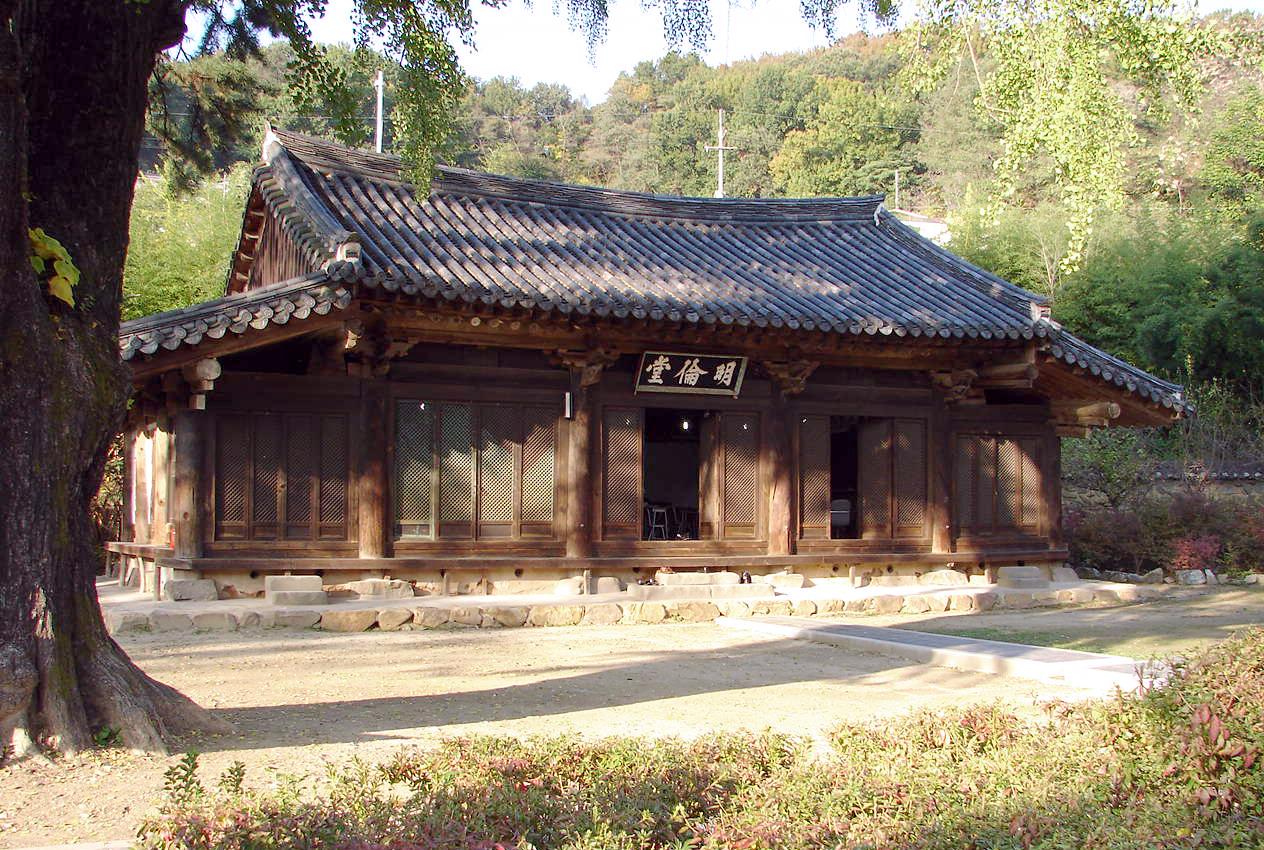
Jeonju Hywanggyo, 1603.

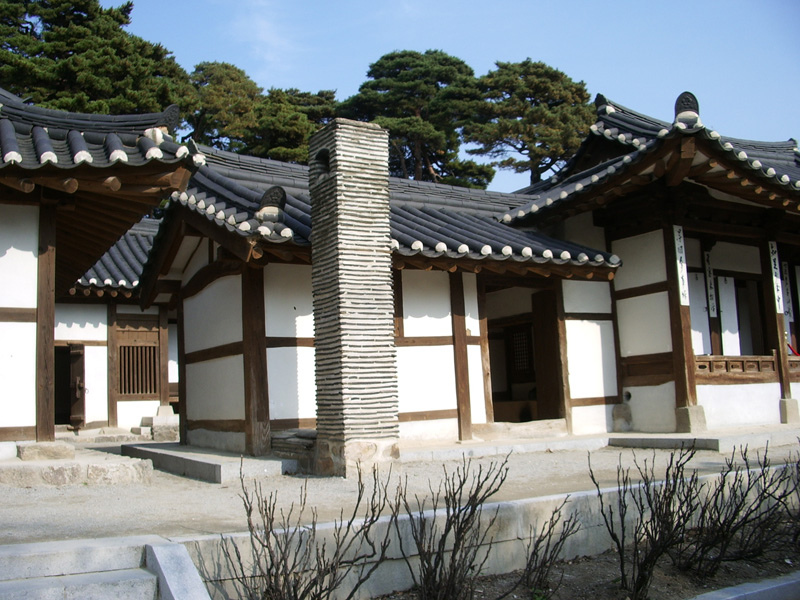
Typical Confucian scholar's residence.

=== Colonial period architecture ===
During the Japanese occupation in the Colonial Korea era from 1910 to 1945, there was an attempt by the colonial government of the Empire of Japan to replace Korean architecture with Japanese architectural traditions. Significant structures of Korean imperial palace compounds and their traditional Korean gardens were demolished. Important landscape elements were removed and sold or taken for use in Japan. Ancient bunjae trees were taken for replanting as bonsai in Japanese gardens. Also during Japanese occupation, the construction of traditional Korean religious buildings (Buddhist or Confucian) was discouraged, as well as adaptations in Christian churches. Some Korean people resisted the Japanese nationalist agenda by building traditional Korean hanok homes, such as the houses of Jeonju village. The colonial disregard for Korean architecture and its history left important Korean landmarks neglected and unmaintained, and the deterioration or demolition of significant examples of architecture resulted. Some historic buildings were also redecorated using Japanese ornamentation methods.

Meanwhile, the Japanese government and private citizens worked to study, restore, and preserve Korean architecture. The restoration of Bulguksa Temple in 1918 and Mireuksaji Stone Pagoda in 1915 are one example.

Japanese colonial architecture was first introduced to Colonial Korea via transportation infrastructure-building programs. New railway lines had Japanese-type railway stations and hotels. The Japanese also built new city halls, post offices, barracks and military bases, jails and prisons, and police stations and police boxes (koban). Having prohibited the use of the Korean language in the media and education, Japan built new schools for the Japanese education of Koreans.

Western 'Euro-American' Revival architectural styles were used for some new buildings important to the Japanese occupation in Korea. An example is the Neoclassical style Japanese General Government Building (1926), the Seoul Station (1925), and the Seoul City Hall (1926).

Materials for building construction in Korea were in short supply. The Korean old-growth forests and particularly large cypress logs were under Japanese logging operations and shipped to Japan, along with other exportable building materials.

The Japanese occupation blocked 20th century Western design movements, including Art Deco and Modernist architecture, from reaching Colonial Korea. Korean architecture with 20th-century influences did not develop until after Korean independence in 1946.

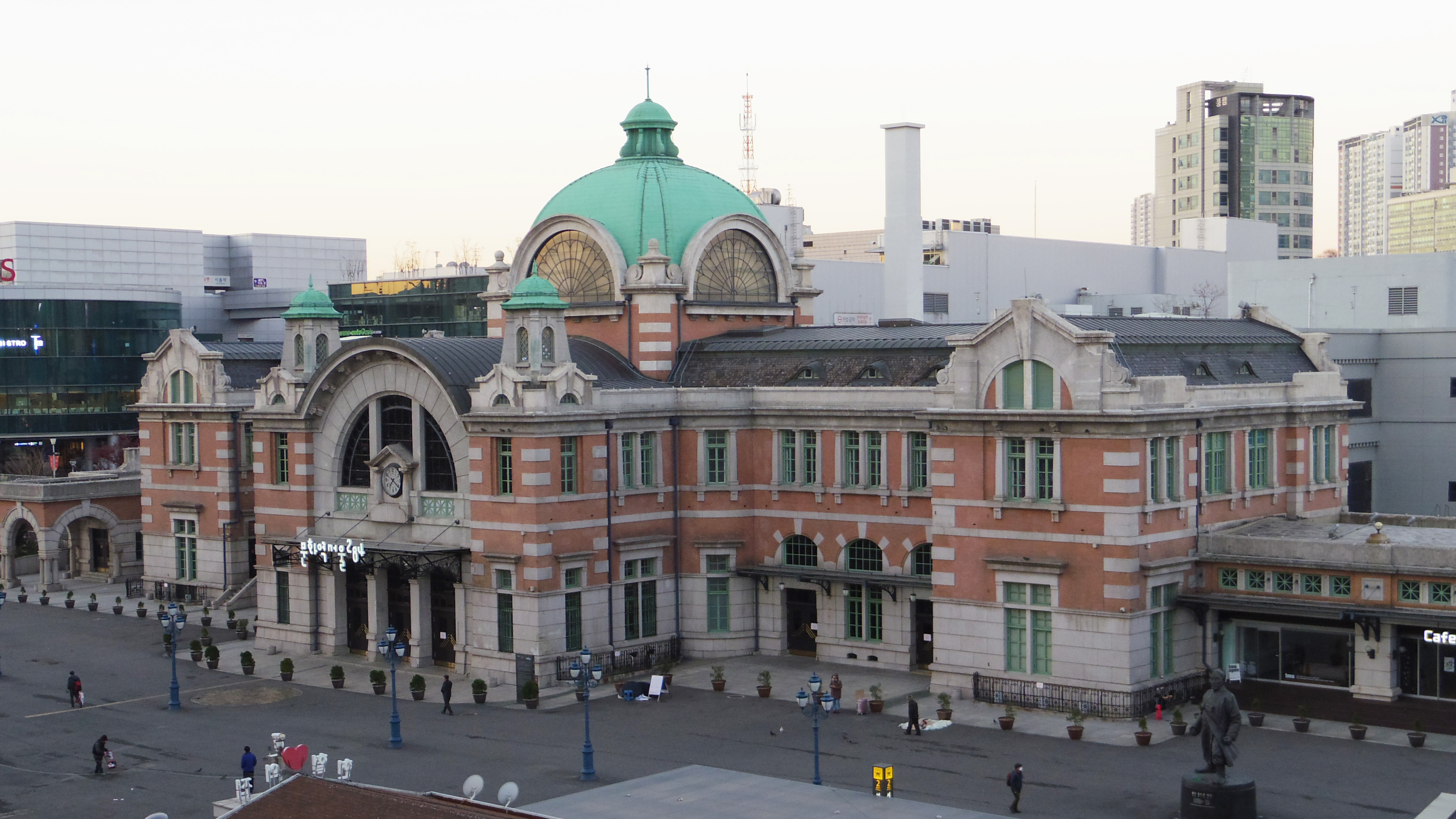
Seoul Station

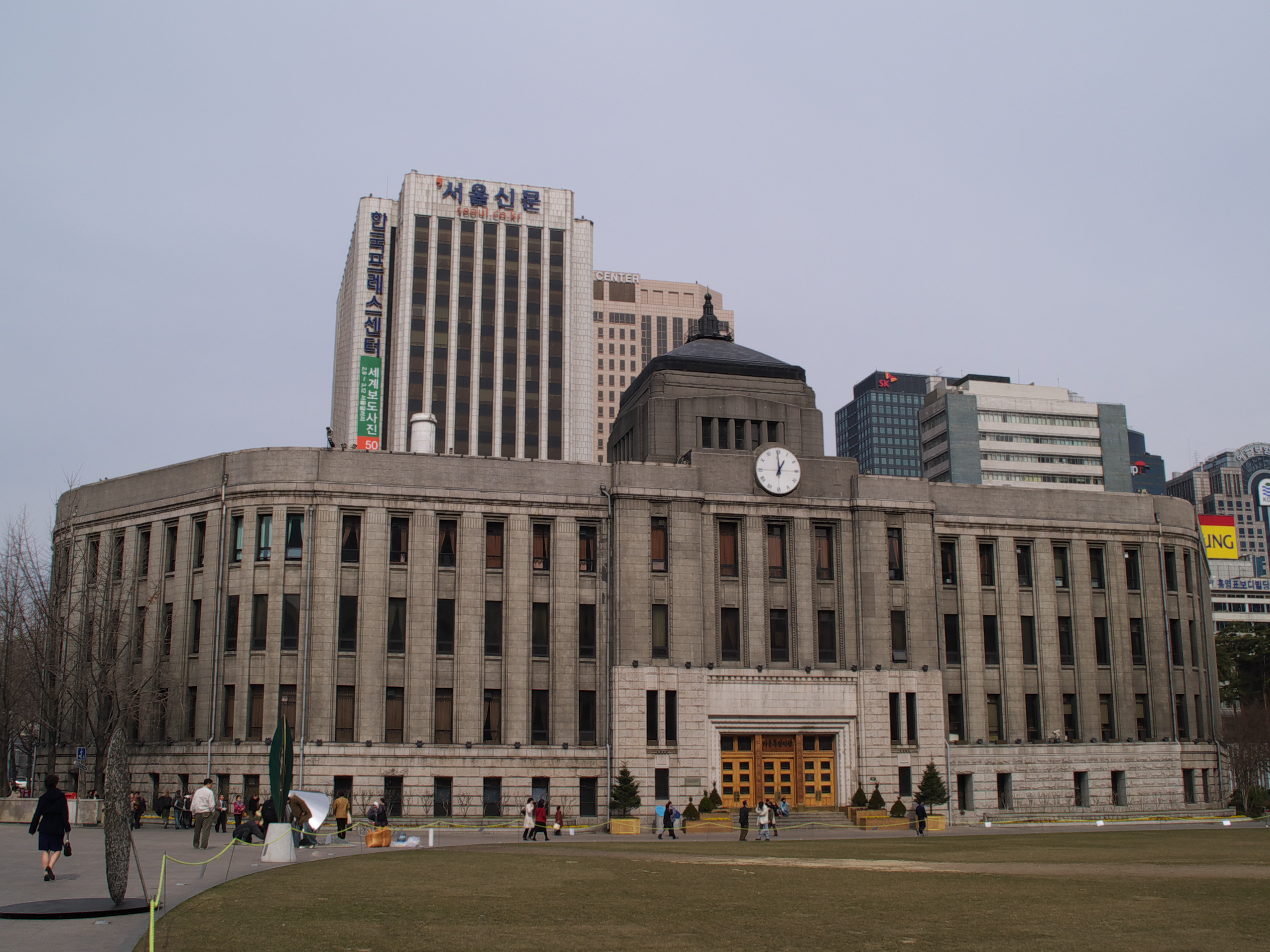
Seoul City Hall

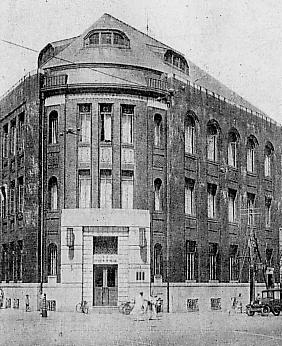
Chosen Commercial Bank Head Office

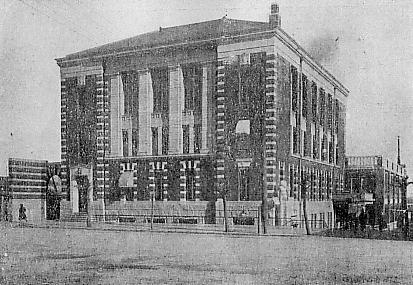
Keijō Nippō Company Building

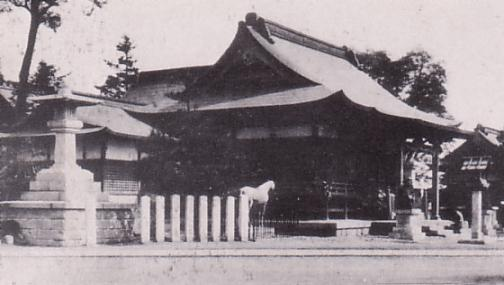
Jinsen Shrine

== Modern architecture ==
=== Post-war period and Korean War architecture ===
After the Surrender of Japan in 1945, American architecture assumed supremacy. Under Douglas MacArthur, who set Korean domestic and political policy from the Supreme Command of the Allied Powers headquarters in Tokyo. Korean architecture by Koreans began once again in domestic areas, with extensive repair of the missionary churches being given priority funding. Essential repair to infrastructure followed, more patch-work than new projects, and block-built hospitals, schools, industries began simple construction under military supervision.

Seoul had survived much of World War II but during the Korean War (1950–1953), many buildings were destroyed, with the city changing command between North Korean and South Korean powers five times. Street-to-street fighting and artillery barrages levelled much of the city, as well as the bridges over the Han River. Important architectural sites were overrun and burnt by invading armies, looting was extensive, and the urban landscape suffered with little money for repairs.

With the armistice, and distinct architectural styles determined by foreign governments began a long period of development.

In the north, Stalinist and absolutist, often brutalist architecture, was championed. North Korean architects studied in Moscow or Soviet satellites, and brought back socialist worker styles and huge celebratory people's architecture on a grand and massively impressive scale. City-dwellers and bureaucrats lived in Soviet-style apartment blocks, farmers and rural workers lived in traditional houses as they always had; urbanization did not occur until fairly recently. Grand buildings and huge public squares were developed in Pyongyang as architectural showpieces. Formal processional landscapes accompanied these sites. Nearly all architecture was government sponsored, and maintained great homogeneity of function and style.

In the south, American models defined all new Korean buildings of any importance, with domestic architecture both civil and rural keeping to traditional buildings, building techniques, and using local materials, and local vernacular styles. The pragmatic need to rebuild a country devastated by genocide, then a civil war, led to ad hoc buildings with no particular styles, extended repeatedly, and a factory system of simple cheap expendable buildings. As few Korean cities had a grid-system, and were often given limits by mountains, few if any urban landscapes had a sense of distinction; by the mid-1950s, rural areas were underfunded, urban areas overfilled, and urban sprawl began with little money to build distinctive important buildings.

Buildings tended to be built quickly with little regard for local identity. As the need for housing for workers increased, traditional hanok villages were razed, hundreds of simple cheap apartments were put up very fast, and bedroom communities on the periphery of the urban centres grew, built and financed as company housing.

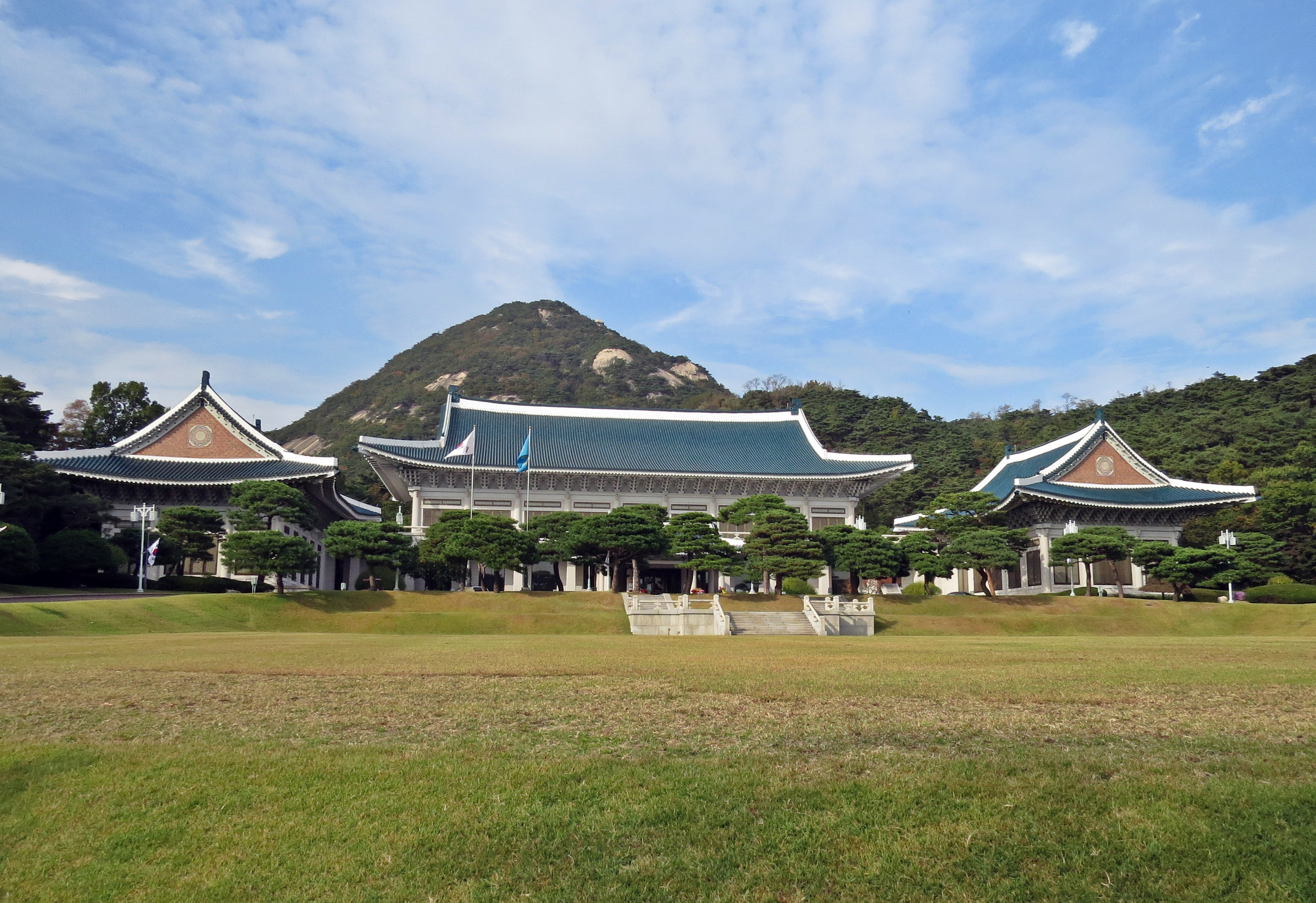
Blue House

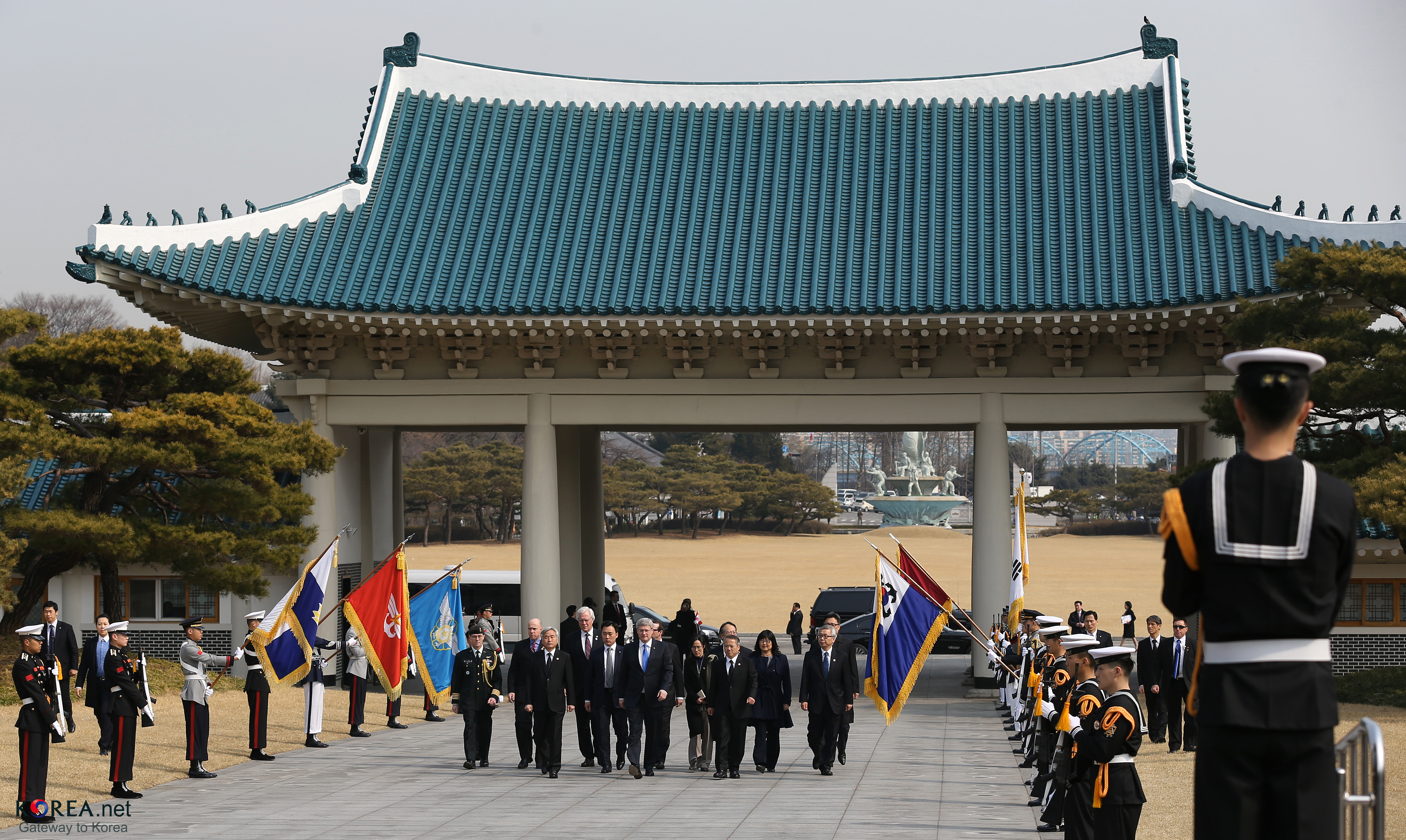
Hyeonchung gate of Seoul National Cemetery

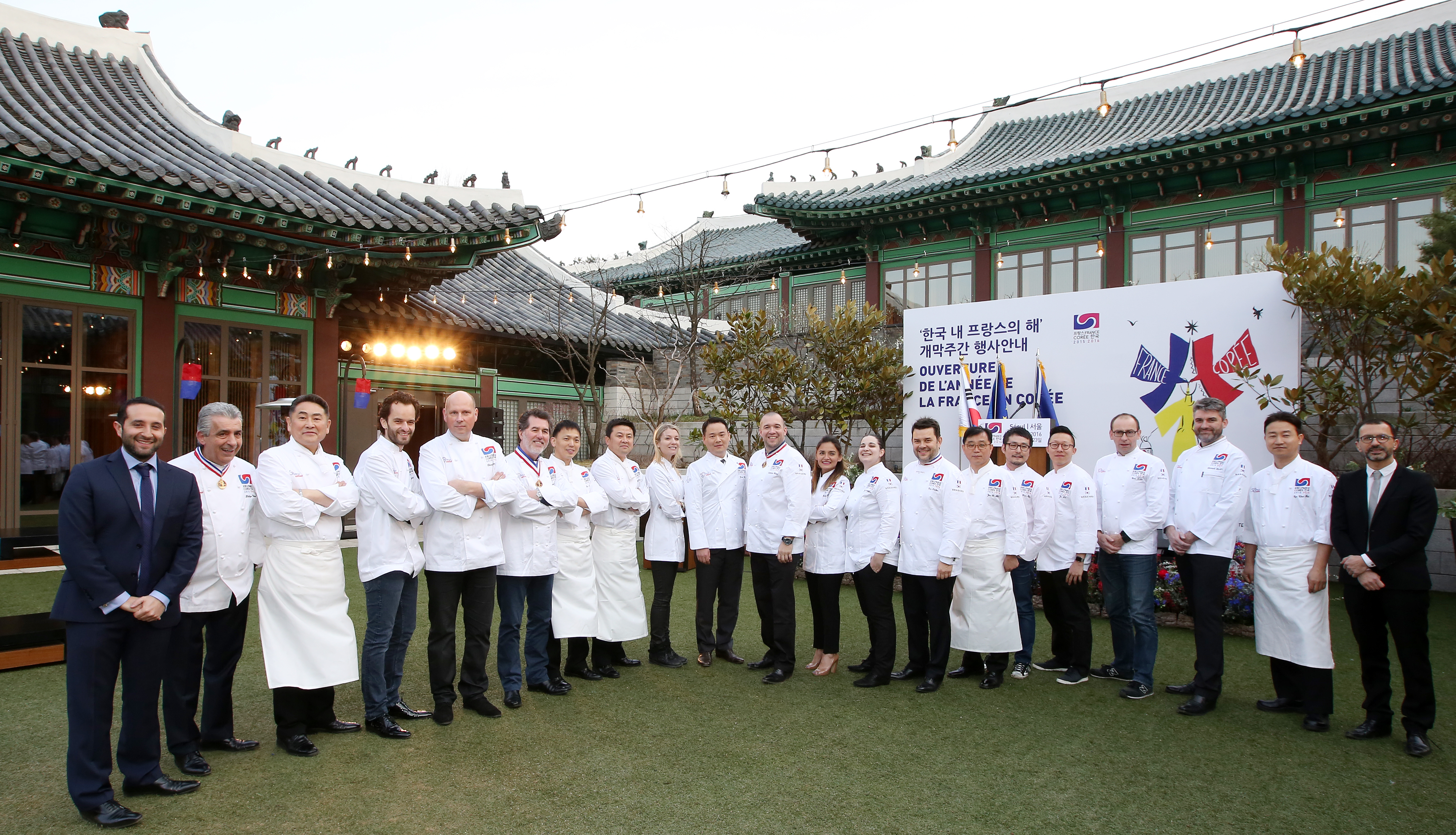
Yeong Bin Gwan of the Shilla Hotel

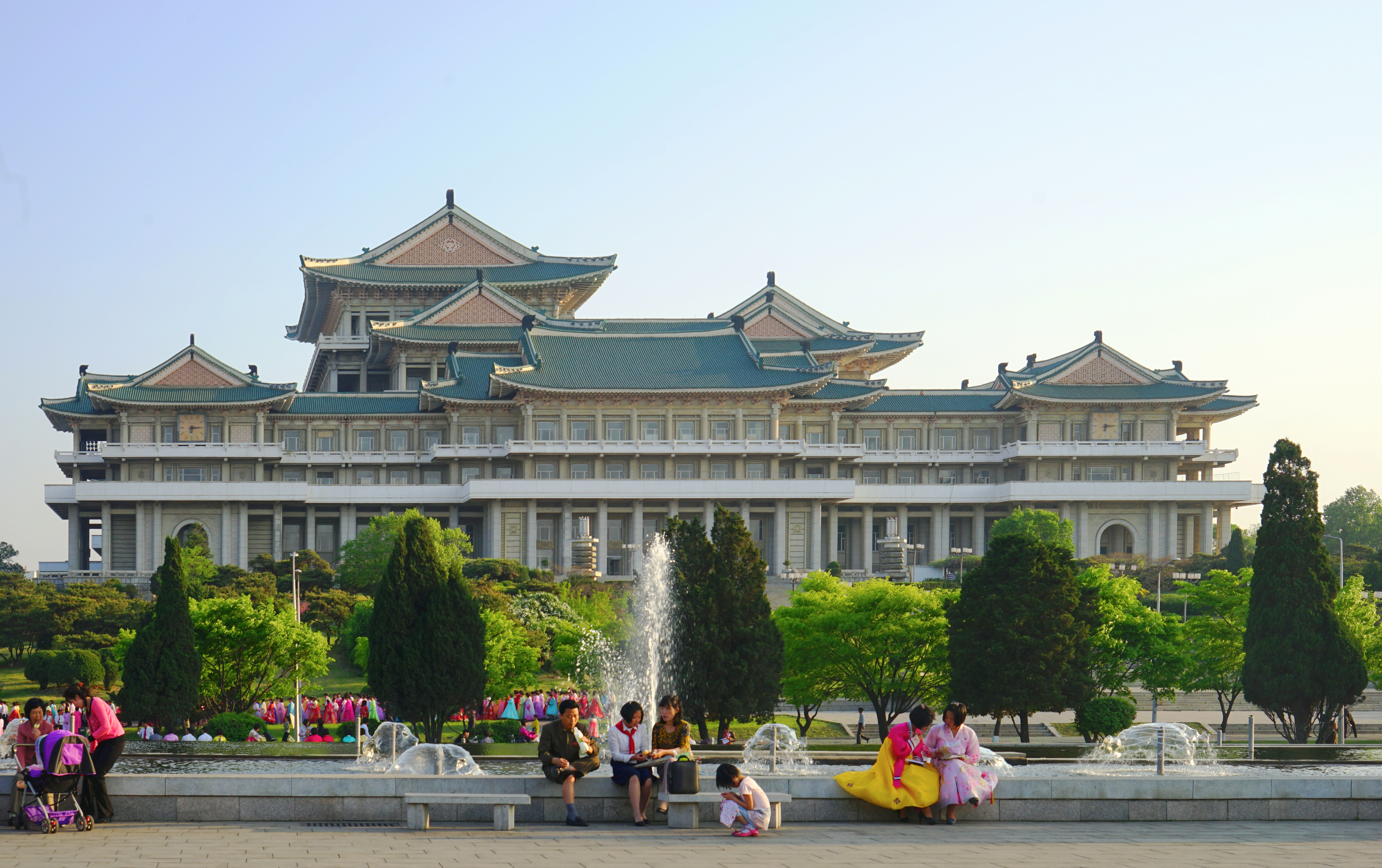
Grand People's Study House

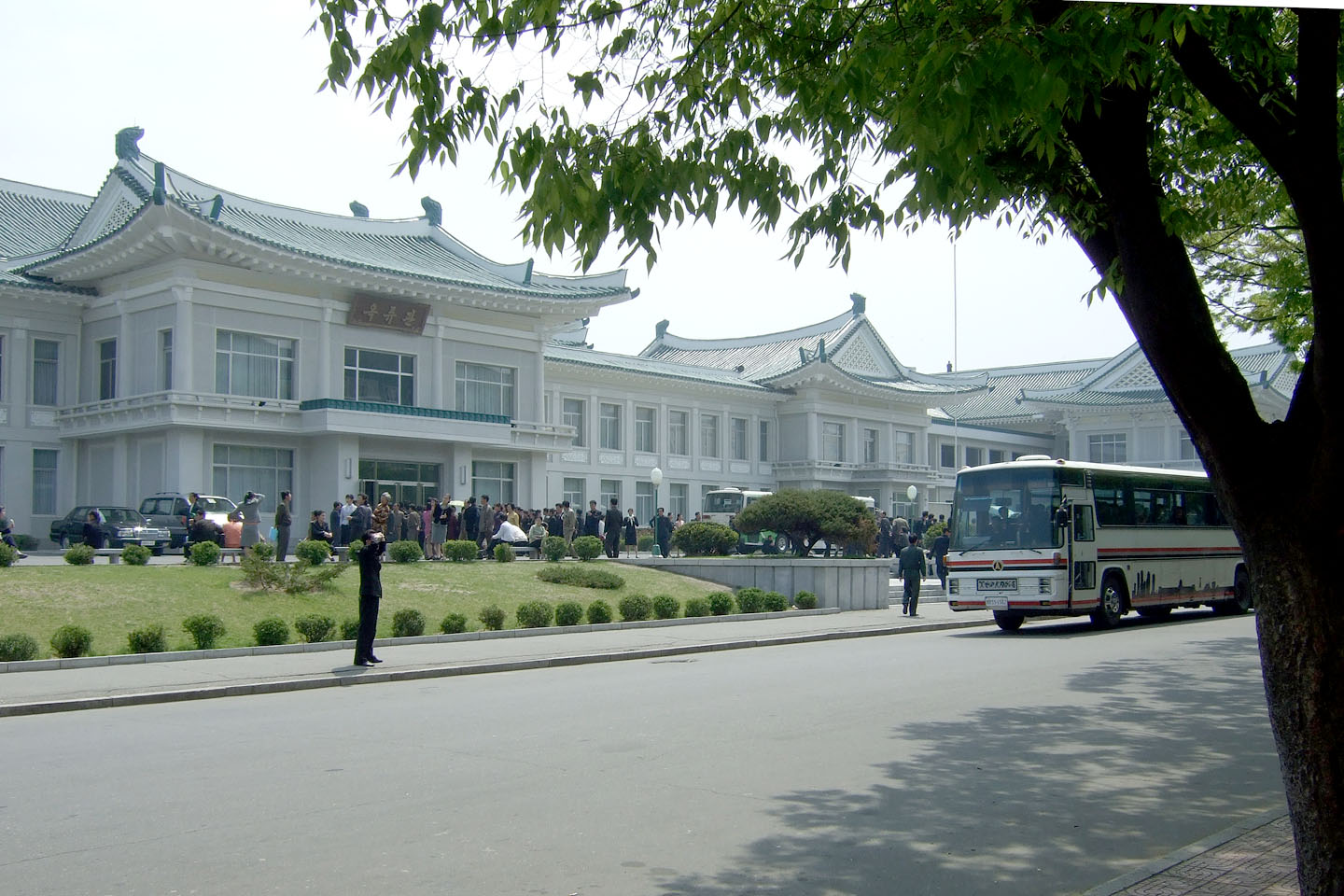
Okryu-gwan

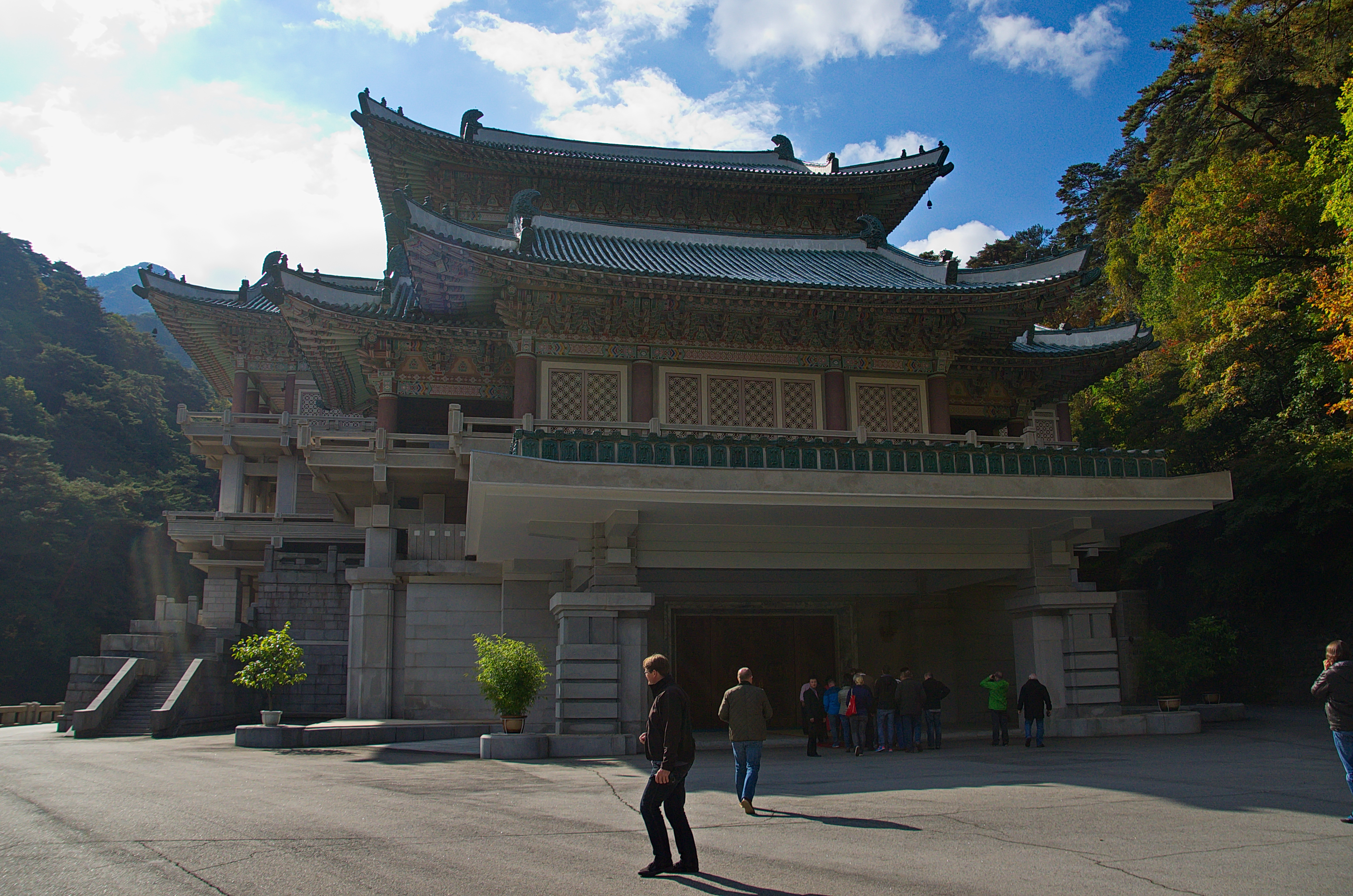
International Friendship Exhibition

=== Sports architecture ===
South Korea was selected to host the 1986 Asian Games and the 1988 Olympic games, which spurred waves of new building activity. To market the country globally, international architects were encouraged to submit designs, introducing alternative concepts for modern architecture that began to put style and form ahead of spartan practicality. Historically, sports architecture has occupied the most money and the greatest expression of form identity within Korea. Hundreds of billions of won have been spent on defining Korea as a sports mecca with the architecture leading the way.

Most of the largest projects in the South, as in the North, were government sponsored works: but instead worked in confined, rather than open spaces, and worked with huge amounts of enclosed space, primarily in the state subsidized hugely expensive sports architecture. Korea since the 1990s had its most notable architectural works driven by sports: the two times which the country has hosted the Asian Games (1986 and 2014), the 1988 Summer Olympics, the 2018 Winter Olympics 2003 Summer Universiade and 2015 Summer Universiade. The country also hosted the 2002 FIFA World Cup, as well as great support being given by the chaebols such as the Samsung Group which itself owned the sports teams for marketing purposes.

Important architects at this time and their works, often led by the atelier-style architectural co-operative Space Group of Korea, were:

- Park Kil-ryong
- Jungup Kim or Kim Chung-up - Trained in France and designed the Olympic Memorial Gate/World Peace Gate, 1988.
- Jongseong Kim – Weight Lifting Gymnasium, Olympic Park, 1986.
- Kim Swoo Geun who trained in Tokyo - Olympic Stadium. 1984. Its total area is 133,649 square metres, with 100,000 seats. It is 245×180 m diameter and 830 m in perimeter.
- Kyu Sung Woo – Olympic Village, 1984.

=== Post-modern Korean architecture ===
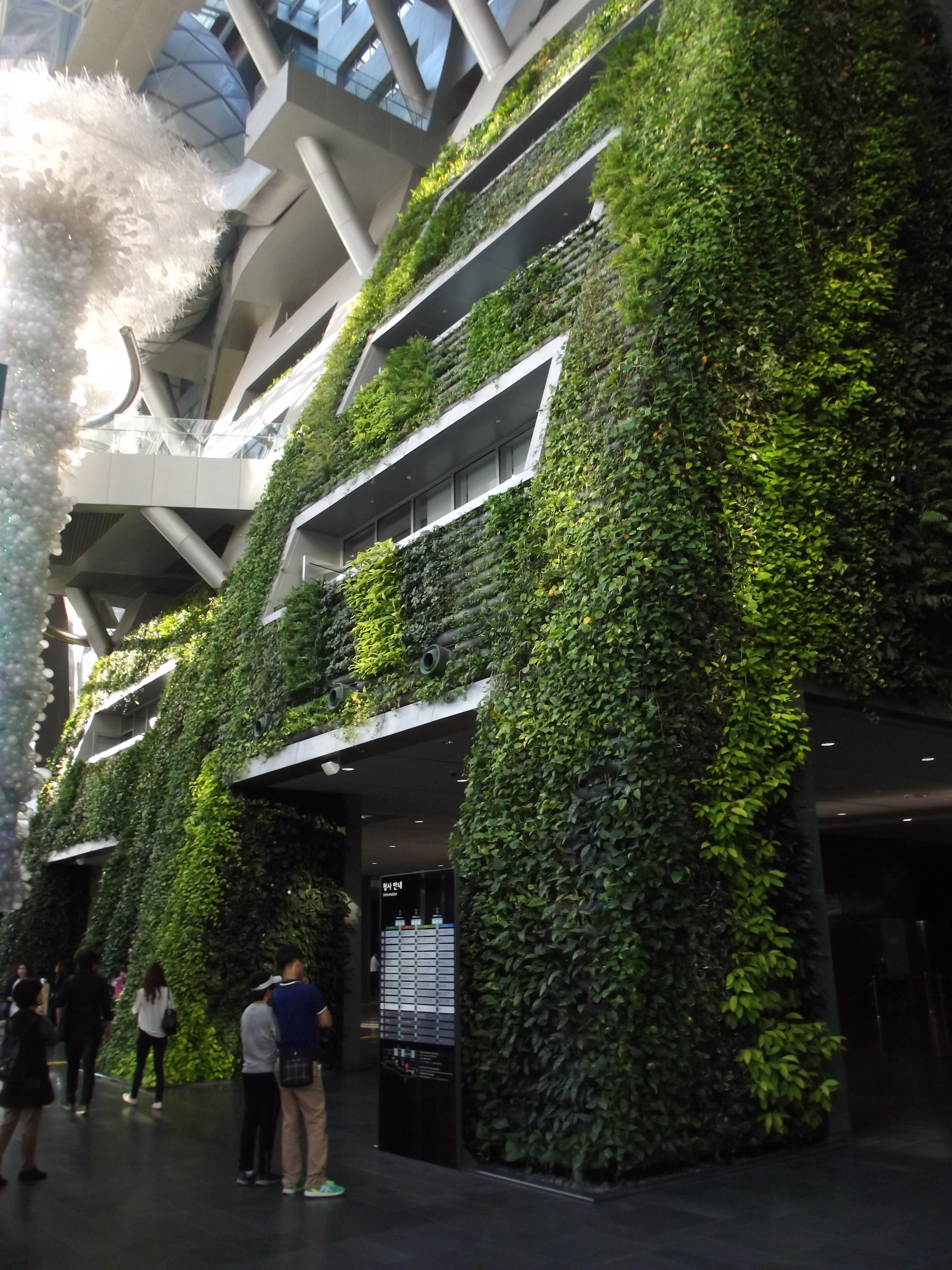
The Green Wall inside of Seoul's City Hall, the tallest indoor vertical garden in the world -- a symbol of the city's intention to adhere to sustainable development.

It was not until the late 1980s and early 1990s that an entirely new generation of Korean architects had the freedom and the financing to build Korean architecture in a distinct Korean manner. This was a result of architects studying and training in Europe, Canada, and even in South America, and seeing the need for more of a sense of unique style, and more sophisticated materials. There was a new determination that nationalistic architectural elements had to be revived and refined. Buildings had to mean something within their cultural context.

Post-modern Korean architecture is defined as from 1986 to 2005. Cultural and museum buildings have followed; with city halls and buildings for the civil service appearing generally in a New York/Chicago style rather than following London or Paris trends.

Individuality and experimentation became the new cause for young architects, however the country as a whole was slow to move from the old traditions into seeing good architecture aesthetics as being important to the sense of a village, town, or city. Change was forced at times against intense resistance, and new buildings evolved at great cost to the architects and builders and within a great tension.

Much of the growth of new architecture came from retail stores, clothing shops, bistros, cafes, and bars; and the underside of architectural commissions, rather than from major government contracts or the financial and corporate community. Foreign corporations setting up Korean headquarters also brought in an entirely new spirit of architecture to define their own visions.

In recent years a number of large and iconic modernist projects have been developed in Seoul such as the 2008 Dominique Perrault building at Ewha Womans University, the 2012 Seoul City Hall extension by iArc and the large Dongdaemun Design Plaza designed by Zaha Hadid and opened in 2014.

Important architects at this time include:

Architectural entity	Work
Um Tok-mun	Sejong Cultural Centre
Kim Seok-Chul	Seoul Arts Centre
Korean Architects Collaborative International under the guidance of Fentress Architects	Incheon International Airport

=== Recent history ===
South Korea's distinct historical progression and its predominantly mountainous terrain have played crucial roles in shaping the architectural landscape of the nation. Approximately 70% of South Korea is covered with mountains, a geographical feature that has profoundly influenced both traditional and contemporary building practices. This rugged terrain required innovative architectural solutions to address the challenges posed by limited flat land available for construction projects. The rapid modernization that South Korea underwent in the late half of the 20th century further accelerated the evolution of its architecture. Post-war economic development, particularly from the 1960s onwards, saw South Korea transforming from a predominantly agricultural society to a technologically advanced urban society. This transition demanded new types of buildings, from residential complexes to commercial and industrial facilities, all designed to maximize the efficient use of space.

=== Historical influence on contemporary architecture ===
Today's Korean architecture can be traced back to historical periods such as the Three Kingdoms period, where they constructed royal palaces, temples, and fortresses. It can also be connected to Chinese architecture with sloping roofs, Modern day Korean wooden-frame architecture is a major example of this that is still prevalent today. This technique was introduced to Korean architects during the Han dynasty. In Seoul, buildings like the British legation and new Korean palace halls in Gyeongungung have a strong resemblance to architecture from the nineteenth century Chinese open ports. These buildings were almost identical to the buildings by the architects from China (Nate et al., 2019) Skyscrapers, malls, and high-rise apartments can be seen all over South Korea. Architects have been incorporating traditional Korean elements into these structures that focus on sustainability, and community engagement.

=== Terrain utilization ===
South Korea is a predominantly a mountainous country, with mountains covering approximately 70% of its territory (R. Adam Dastrup, 2020). This challenging terrain has required the development of unique architectural techniques to optimize land use while accommodating a dense population. One such technique is the construction of terraced buildings, also known as terraced housing. These structures share side walls and are built over multiple levels, allowing a greater number of residents to occupy a smaller footprint of land, while maintaining privacy and a comfortable home environment. Korean architects have not only adapted but excelled in designing structures on steep slopes, transforming previously uninhabitable mountainous areas into viable residential and commercial spaces. Unlike larger countries with a vast amount of flat land who might avoid such complex constructions, South Korea has embraced these challenges. Techniques like slope stabilization are frequently employed to prevent erosion and maintain the structural integrity of hillside constructions. This method involves various engineering practices such as retaining walls, terracing, and the use of vegetation to bind the soil, all of which are crucial in preventing landslides and other forms of land degradation. The integration of modern engineering with traditional Korean architectural elements, like the efficient use of space and harmony with the natural environment, is evident. The incorporation of advanced technologies and sustainable building practices reflects South Korea's commitment to innovation and environmental integrity in architecture. This approach not only enhances the aesthetic value of the buildings but also ensures their sustainability and resilience against the unique challenges posed by the country's rugged landscape.

== See also ==
- Daemokjang
- Korean fortress
- List of fortresses in Korea
- Korean pagoda
- List of gates in Korea
- Hahoe Folk Village
- Yangdong Village of Gyeongju
- Korean Folk Village
- Hanok
- Iljumun
- Hongsalmun
- List of Korean architects
