= Cheong Wa Dae =

Presidential residence in Seoul, South Korea

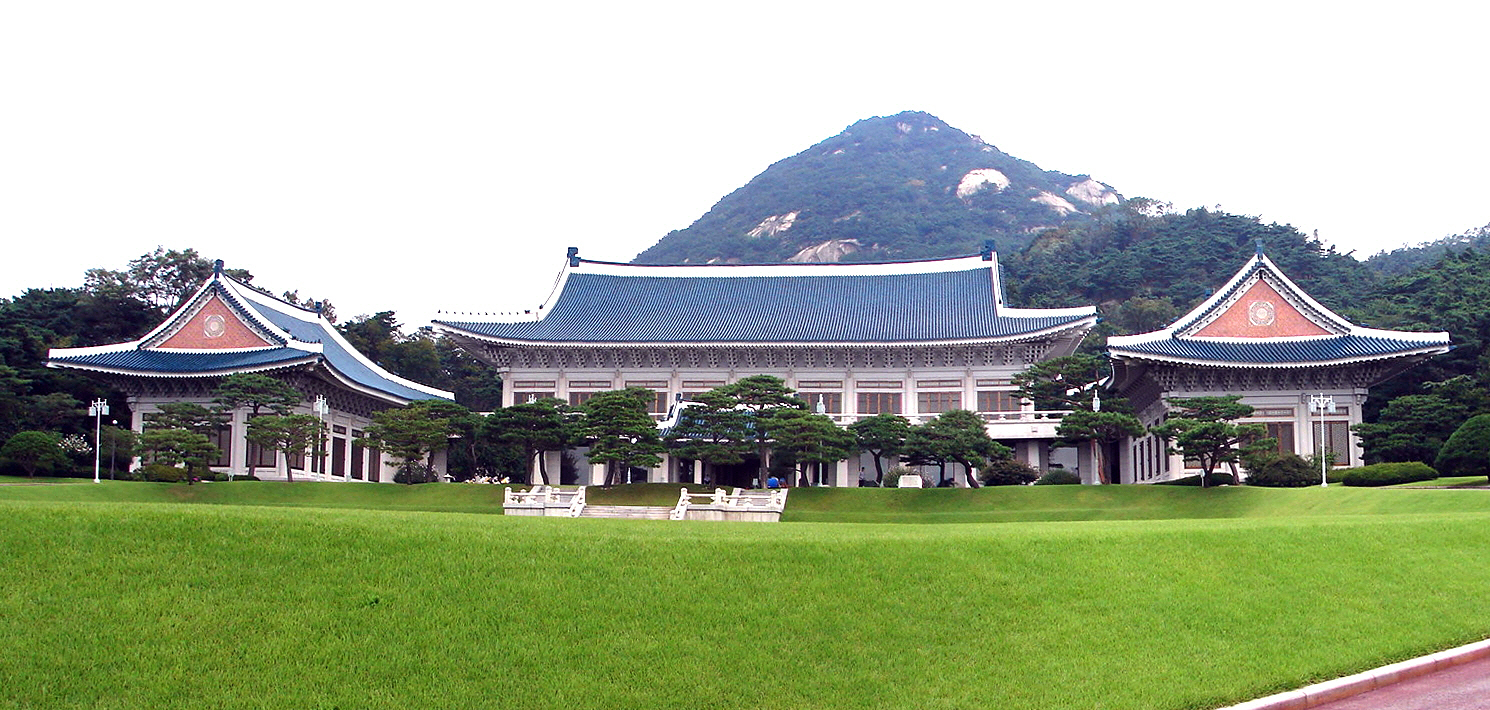
- The overview of Cheong Wa Dae

- Location within Seoul
- Former names: Gyeong Mu Dae (1948–1960)
- Alternative names: Blue House

General information
- Architectural style: Traditional Korean
- Location: 1 Cheongwadae-ro, Jongno-gu, Seoul, South Korea, Seoul, South Korea
- Coordinates: 37.5867°N 126.9763°E
- Current tenants: President of South Korea
- Groundbreaking: 22 March 1937
- Topped-out: 20 September 1939
- Opened: 1948 (as presidential residence)
- Renovated: 22 July 1989 – 4 September 1991
- Closed: 10 May 2022 – 28 December 2025 (as public park)
- Owner: Government of South Korea

Technical details
- Floor count: 2 floors above ground, 1 basement

Website
- opencheongwadae.kr/eng

Korean name
- Hangul: 청와대
- Hanja: 靑瓦臺
- Lit.: Cyan-tile Pavilion
- RR: Cheongwadae
- MR: Ch'ŏngwadae

Cheong Wa Dae (Korean: 청와대), also known as the Blue House, is the executive office and residence of the president of South Korea. Located in Seoul's Jongno District, directly behind the former Gyeongbokgung palace, it has served as the center of presidential administration and state receptions since 1948, except for a three-year period during the presidency of Yoon Suk Yeol from 2022 to 2025, during which it was opened to the public as a museum and urban park.

Cheong Wa Dae is a complex of multiple buildings built largely in the traditional Korean architectural style with some modern architectural elements and facilities. It currently consists of the Main Office Hall Bon-gwan, (Note: 본관; 本館; lit. ''Main House'') the Presidential Residence, the State Reception House Yeongbin-gwan, (Note: 영빈관; 迎賓館; lit. ''Welcome-Guest House'') the Chunchu-gwan, (Note: 춘추관; 春秋館; lit. ''Spring-Autumn House'') Press Hall, the Secretariat Buildings, and other buildings and structures. The entire complex covers approximately 250,000 square metres or 62 acres.

Cheong Wa Dae was built upon the site of the royal garden of the Joseon period (1392–1910). While Cheong Wa Dae served as an executive office, it was one of the most protected official residences in Asia. Upon the inauguration of President Yoon Suk Yeol in May 2022, Cheong Wa Dae was relieved of its duties as the official residence and executive office of the president, as the president's offices and residence were moved to the Ministry of National Defense building. The grounds served as a public park until late 2025. Since the impeachment and removal of President Yoon Suk Yeol in December 2024, there have been calls to return the presidential office and official residence to Cheong Wa Dae. President Lee Jae Myung returned to Cheong Wa Dae on 29 December 2025.

== Early history ==
=== Goryeo and Joseon eras ===
Cheong Wa Dae dates back to the Goryeo period of Korea. The location of Cheong Wa Dae was the site of a royal villa in Hanyang, the southern capital of the Goryeo dynasty (918–1392). It was built by King Sukjong (r. 1095–1105) in 1104. Goryeo's principal capital was at Kaesong, and it also maintained a western capital at Pyongyang and an eastern capital at Gyeongju on opposite sides of the Korean Peninsula. After the Joseon period (1392–1897) moved its capital to Hanyang, Gyeongbokgung was built in 1395, the fourth year of the reign of King Taejo (r. 1392–1398) as the main palace, and the royal villa lot became the back garden of the palace. It was used as the site for civil service examinations and military training. Feng Shui singer Kim Wi-je said, "Samgaksan Mountain is a scenic view facing north and south. The mountain range that started there is three and four, and they are defending the famous place, so if you rely on Samgaksan Mountain to build a capital, the Dead Sea will come and pay tribute in nine years". After King Taejo of the Joseon Dynasty established the country, the new capital was designated in Hanseongbu. Later, in 1394, a new palace was built; the site was near the palace site of Nanjing, Goryeo, north of the former royal palace Gyeongbokgung. At that time, it was said that there were temples such as Chungsundang and Chirojeong Pavilion in this place. Here, descendants of kings and founding contributors gathered to conduct large-scale membership.

After Gyeongbokgung was burned down during the 1592–1598 Japanese invasions of Korea, it was left unattended for a long time. However, during the reign of King Gojong, Gyeongbokgung was rebuilt under the leadership of Heungseon Daewongun, and a support was built outside the Sinmumun Gate and in the current Cheong Wa Dae. Later, buildings such as Yoongmundang were built in the background, and Gyeongmudang was also renovated at this time. There were 32 buildings in Gyeongmudae, including Oungak, a resting place for the king. In Yoongmundang, a festival and military training were held.

=== 1910–1948: Foreign occupations ===
Following the Empire of Japan's annexation of Korea in 1910, the Imperial Japanese governor of Korea used the Gyeongbokgung grounds for the Government-General Building. In 1927, many buildings in the background, including Gyeongmudae, were demolished. In July 1939, Japan built an official residence/office for the governor-general on the site of Cheong Wa Dae. Even after liberation following the Second World War (1939/1941–1945) in September 1945, this location was used as the official residence by the occupying United States and its designated United States Army Military Government in Korea's John Hodge, during 1945-1948.

== Evolution of Cheong Wa Dae ==
=== 1948–2022: Presidential residence of South Korea and attempt to relocate ===
After the establishment of the South Korean government in the southern portion of the Korean Peninsula in 1948, its first president Syngman Rhee (served 1948–1960) named the former Imperial Japanese Governor-General's residence Gyeongmudae (경무대; 景武臺; lit. ''Scenery–force Pavilion''), which was the name of one of the few old buildings for former official residence there. He used it as his office and residence. The second South Korean President, Yun Po-sun (1897–1990, served 1960–1962), changed the name to "Cheong Wa Dae" after he was inaugurated in 1960. The name was reportedly changed as it had ostensibly become associated with authoritarianism and dictatorship. An alternate name "Hwaryeongdae" was proposed alongside "Cheong Wa Dae" as a possible renaming candidate, but the latter was ultimately chosen.

After Park Chung Hee (served 1963–1979) came to power through a military coup as the third President, some argued that the colour should be changed to yellow, saying it is a more precious color, but Park dismissed it. During the Park regime, the Cheong Wa Dae structure had a president's office on the first floor and a living space for the president's family on the second floor. However, as the building was narrow and ageing, a major renovation was carried out during the Park administration.

In January 1968, North Korean infiltrators nearly reached the building in a bid to assassinate Park during the Blue House raid. In the ensuing melee, 28 North Koreans, 26 South Koreans, and four Americans were killed.

On 26 October 1979, Park was assassinated by the Korean Central Intelligence Agency (KCIA) Director, Kim Jae-gyu in a safe house on the Blue House grounds.

Presidents Park, Choi Kyu-hah, and Chun Doo-hwan used the building both as their office and official residence. While President Roh Tae-woo was in office, a new office building, official residence, and press center, called Chunchu-gwan, were built. The main office building was opened in April 1991. In September 1991, an advisory committee consisting of 22 experts was formed to gather opinions and build the current main building, official residence, and Chunchugwan. In 1993, during Kim Young-sam's presidency, the building built by Japan for the then-official residence was dismantled. Roh Moo-hyun tried to change the structure of the main building to strengthen communication with the staff, but failed. The wartime evacuation facility built by Park in 1975 was repaired in 2003 to create a room (underground bunker) for the National Crisis Management Centre.

Because the Cheong Wa Dae has often been regarded as a symbol of the president's power, many presidents have made efforts to relocate the presidential office and residence.

Kim Young-sam was the first to push for relocation as a symbolic break from the previous military dictatorship era. Kim Young-sam pledged to move his office to the Seoul Government Complex near Gwanghwamun but was unable to achieve this. Instead, the road in front of Cheong Wa Dae and the mountain Inwangsan was made open to the public. In addition, 12 safe houses located in Gungjeong-dong and Samcheong-dong were demolished, and Mugunghwa Garden, a civic park, was created.

Kim Dae Jung also pushed for a plan to set up offices at the Seoul and Gwacheon Government Complex but stopped due to security and cost problems. Instead, measures were taken to open the Chilgung Palace located in the Cheong Wa Dae precincts and expand the scope of Cheong Wa Dae viewing.

The Roh Moo-hyun administration tried to move all government departments, including Cheong Wa Dae, to Sejong City but failed due to the Constitutional Court's decision to confirm the unconstitutionality of the new administrative capital law. Since then, Roh Moo Hyun opened Sinmumun Gate, the northern gate of Gyeongbokgung, and Bukaksanseong-ro.

During the Lee Myung-bak administration, the relocation of the secretary's and security's office was also considered, but it was suspended due to costs and approval needed by the National Assembly. Moon Jae-In made President Gwanghwamun a presidential election pledge, but after taking office, it was cancelled due to security and cost issues. Instead, the road in front of Cheong Wa Dae and the fortress road of Bugaksan, which had been temporarily opened, were completely opened.

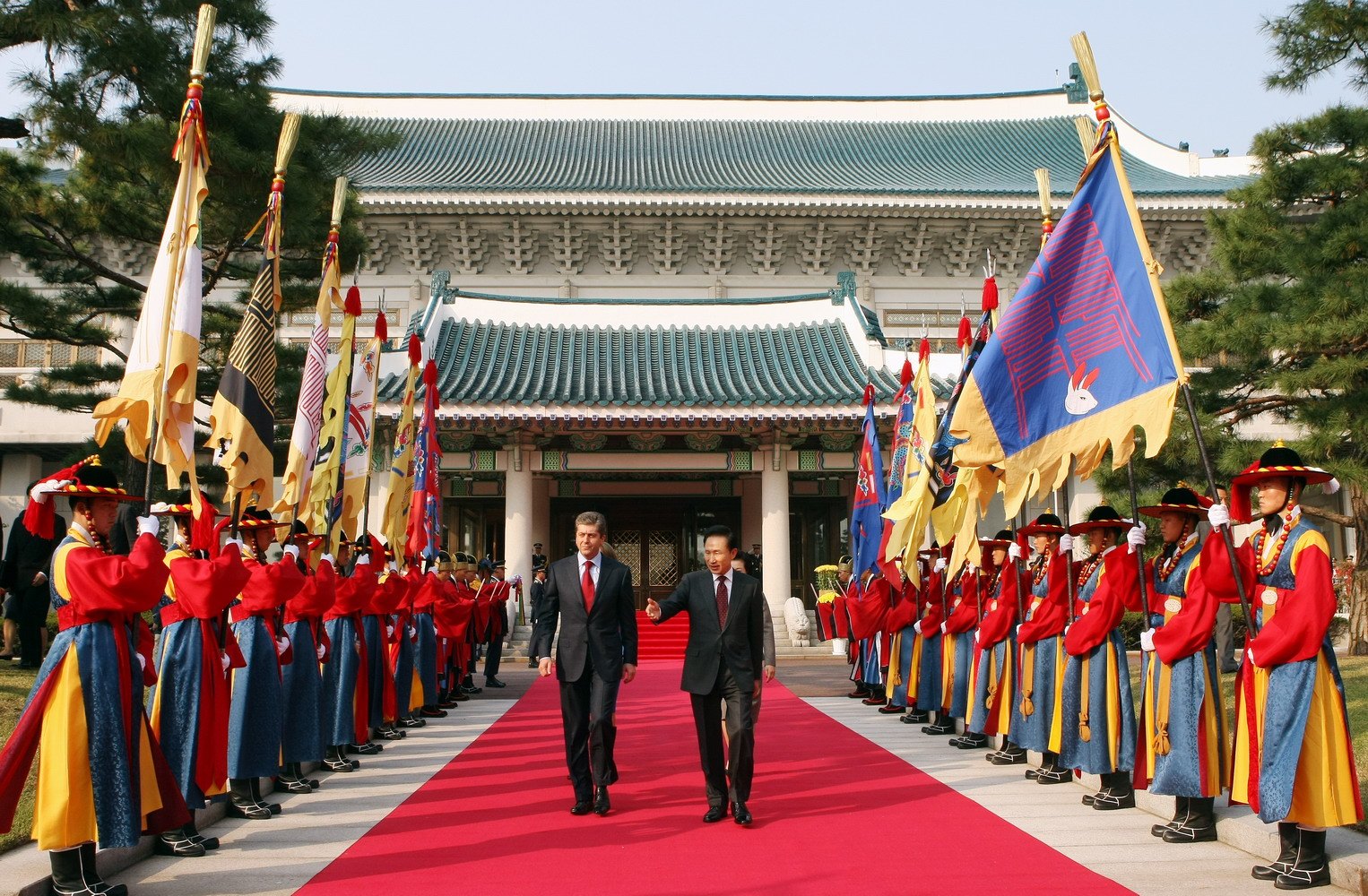
President Lee Myung-bak and Bulgarian President Georgi Parvanov (2009)

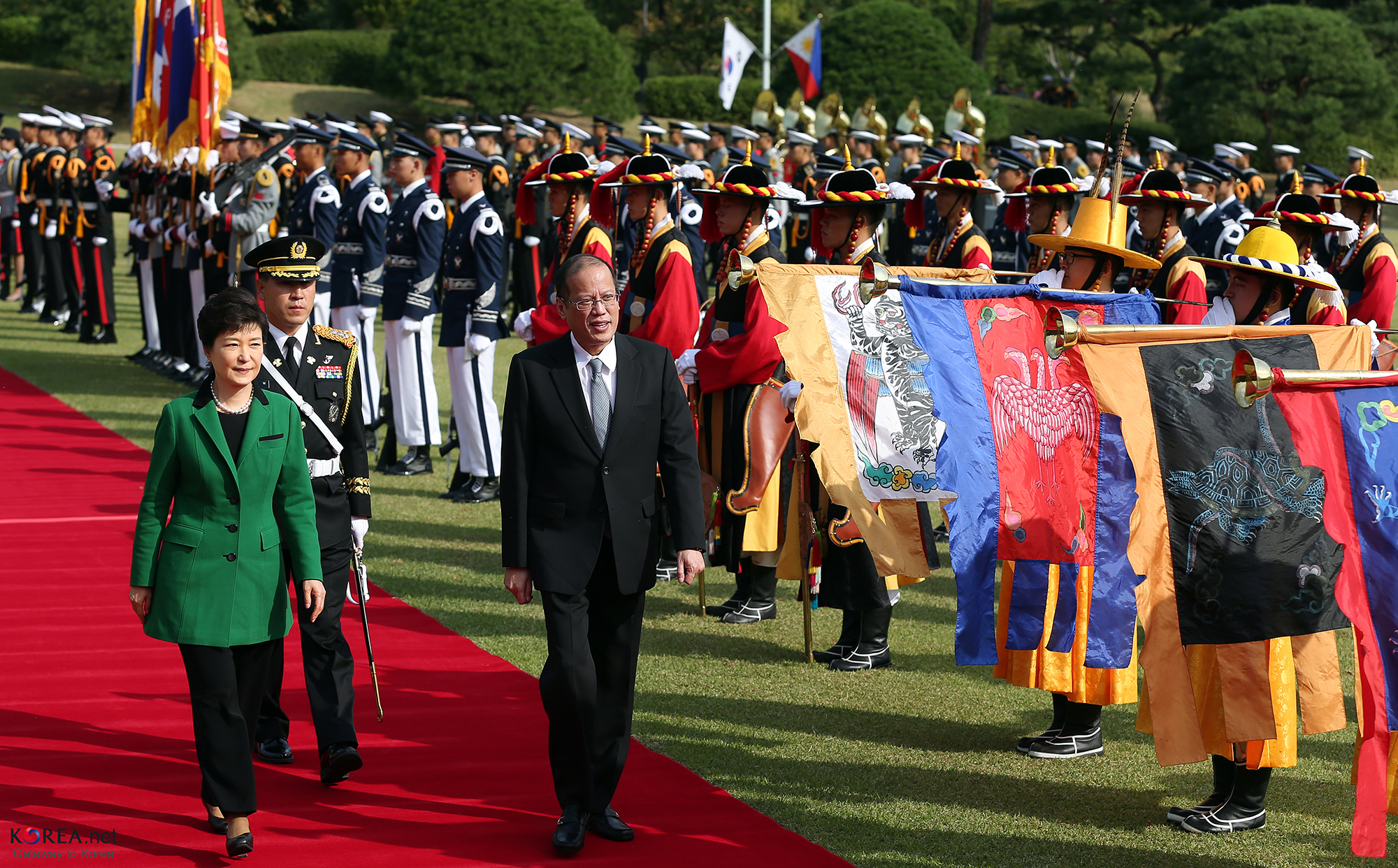
President Park Geun-hye and Philippine President Benigno Aquino III (2013)

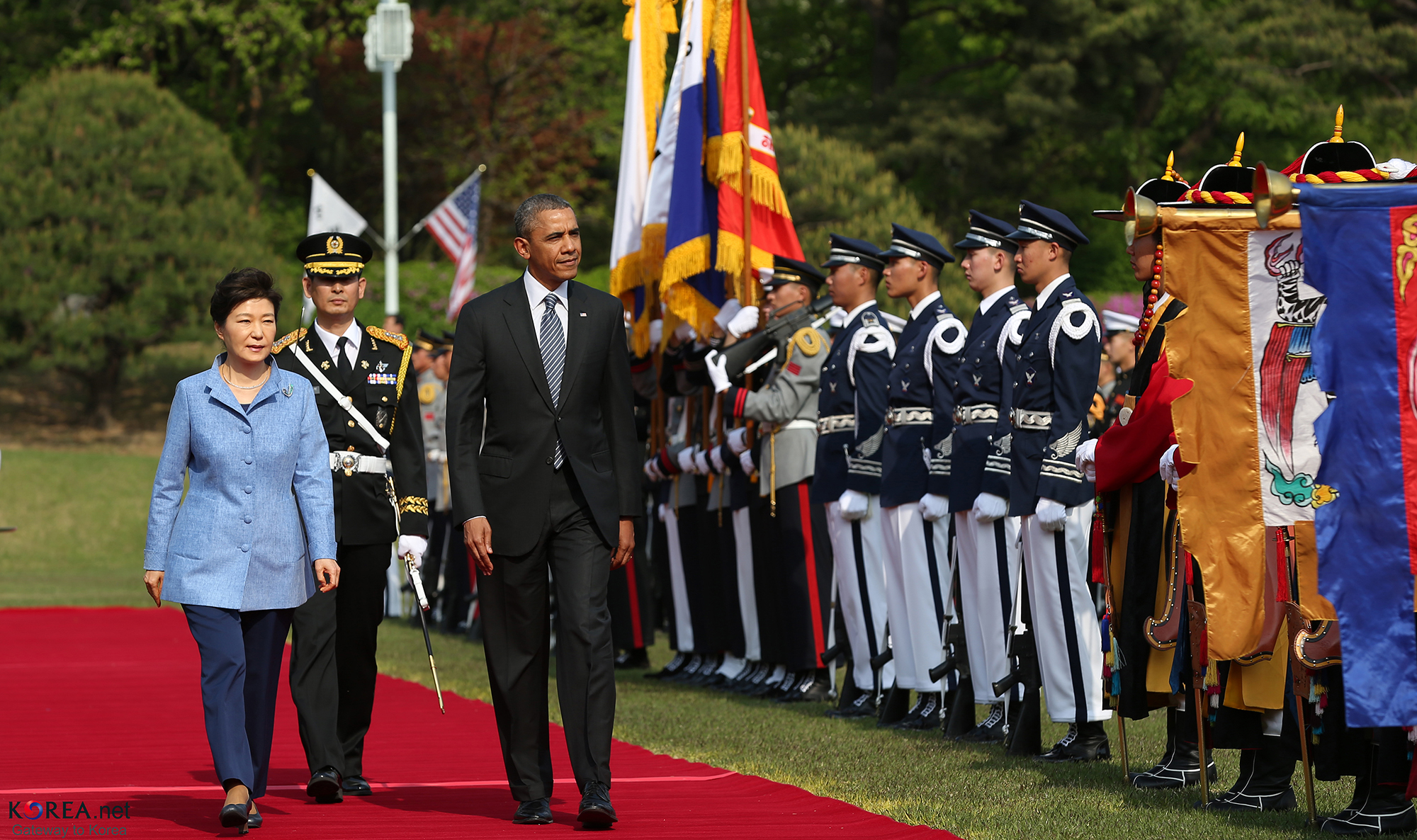
President Park Geun-hye and US President Barack Obama (2014)

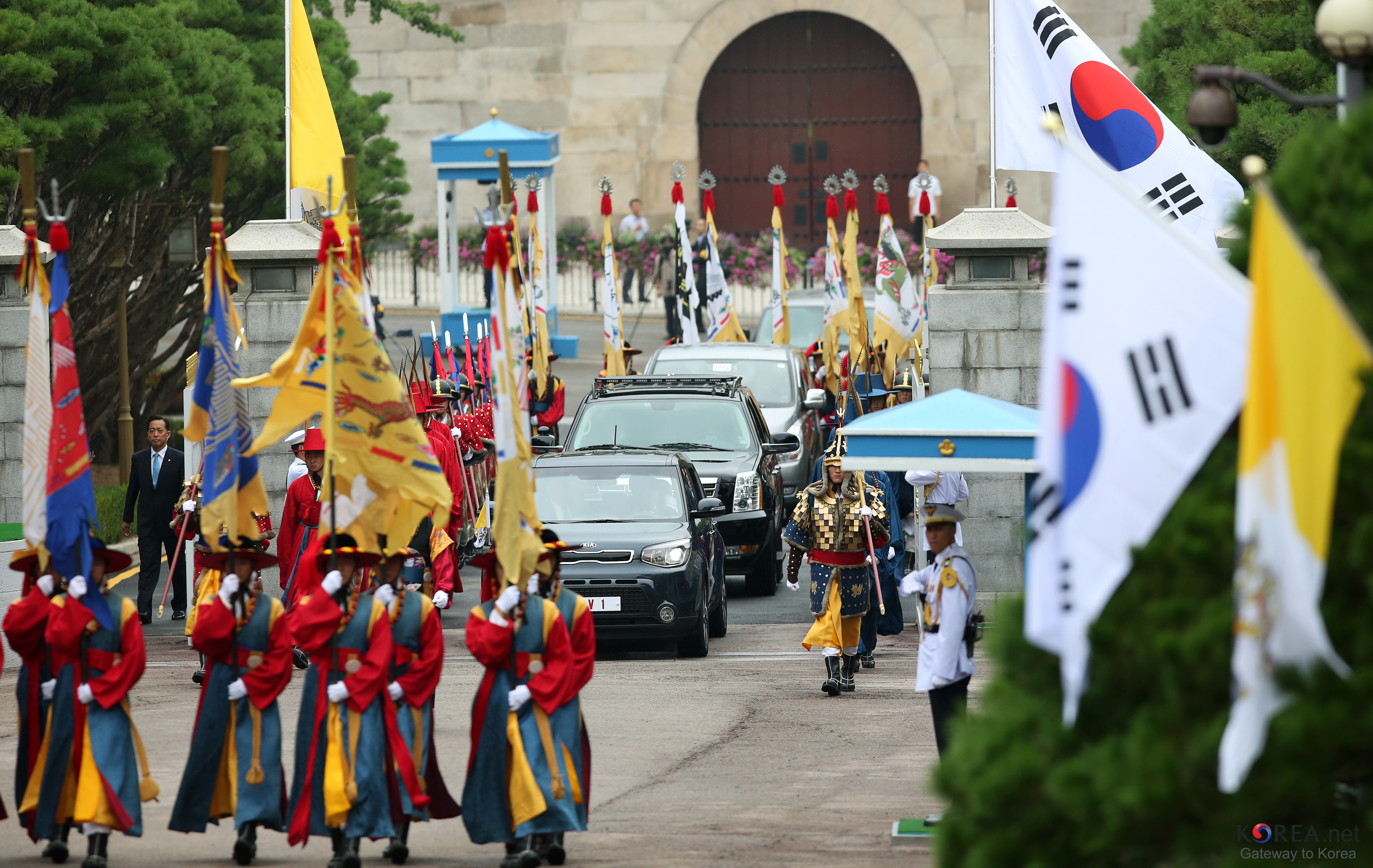
Official Welcome Ceremony for Pope Francis by Ministry of National Defense Traditional Band and Traditional Honor Guard (2014)

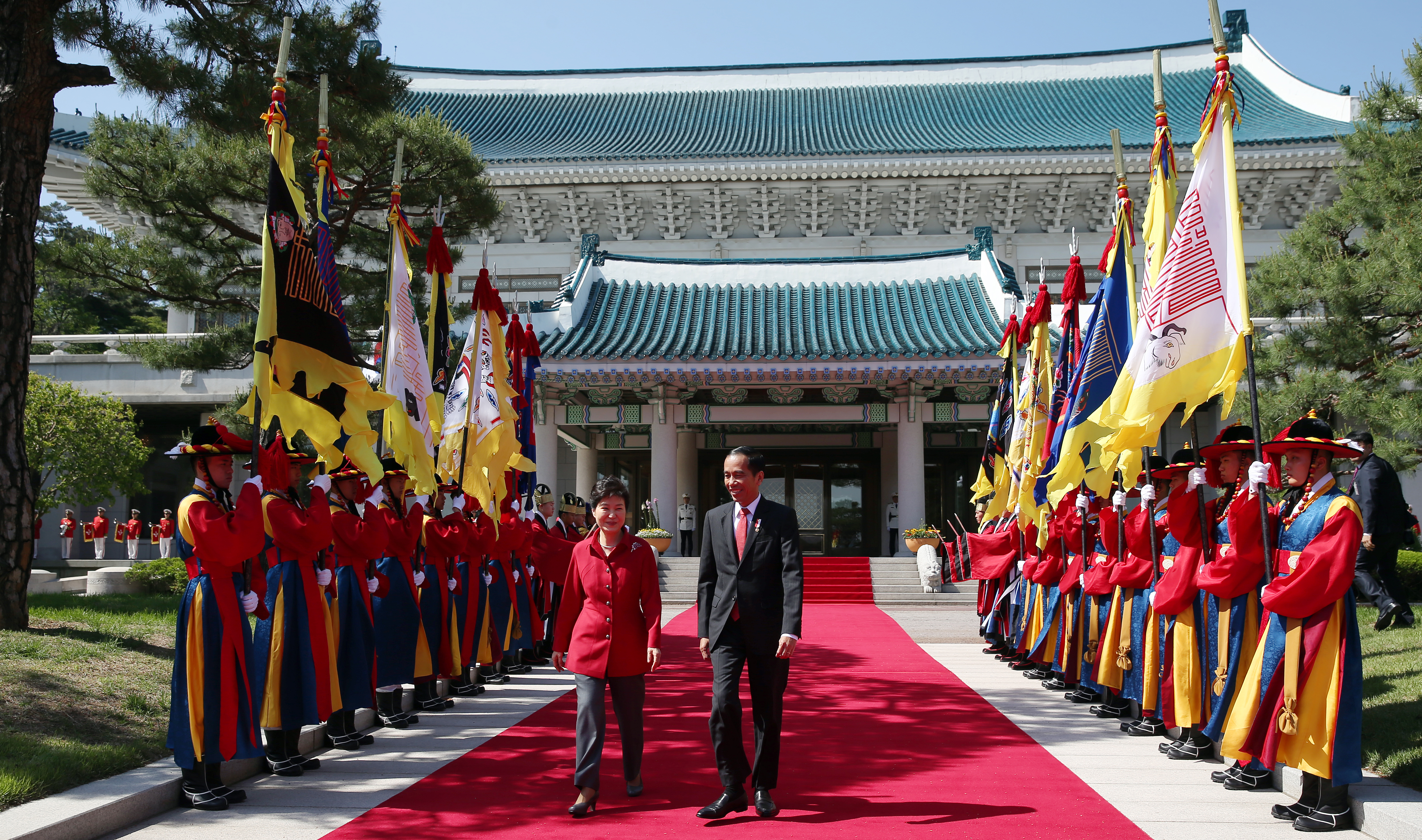
President Park Geun-hye and Indonesian President Joko Widodo (2016)

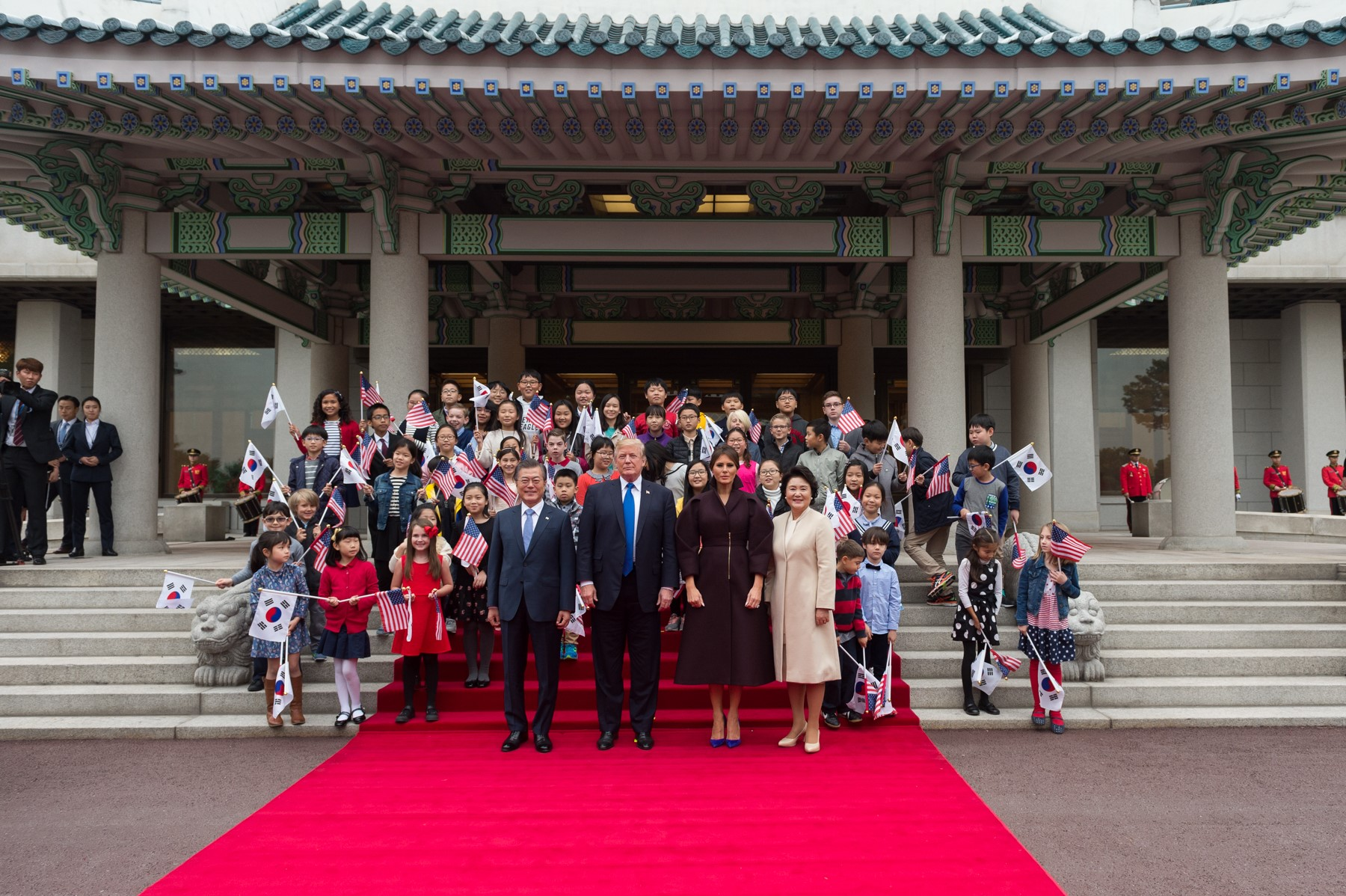
President Moon Jae-in and US President Donald Trump (2017)

=== 2022–2025: Conversion into a public park ===
On 20 March 2022, President-elect Yoon Suk Yeol announced that he would take office on 10 May in the Ministry of National Defense building in the Yongsan District of Seoul, and open Cheong Wa Dae to the public as a park. In May 2022, following an order issued by Yoon after he took office, the building officially converted into a public park and opened to public visitation for the first time in its 74-year history, with a maximum of 39,000 visitors allowed daily. The visitors could witness cultural performances, tours, and use hiking trails that lead to the mountain Bugaksan, Cheongwadae's scenic backdrop.

The Government of South Korea allocated ₩36 billion (about $29.5 million) from government reserve funds for the relocation of the office. However, the Ministry of National Defense at the time faced criticism, with concerns raised regarding the potential negative impact on national security, associated costs, and other issues such as heightened nuclear activity in North Korea and challenges to post-pandemic economic recovery. A survey revealed that 58% of the people opposed this move.

=== 2025–present: Restoration of Cheong Wa Dae as presidential office ===
In December 2024, after the impeachment of President Yoon, there were increasing calls to restore Cheong Wa Dae as the presidential office and official residence. Rep. Kim Byung-joo of the Democratic Party, a former general, said that the Yongsan office was unsuitable as a presidential office, while conservative mayor of Daegu, Hong Joon-pyo said that Yoon's move away from Cheong Wa Dae "diminished the president's charisma from the outset and emboldened the (political) opposition" and "The Blue House, like the White House in the United States, is a symbol of Korea". A joint survey released in June 2025 and conducted by South Korean broadcasters KBS, MBC and SBS found that 58.2% of respondents supported having the next South Korean president work at Cheong Wa Dae. Following his inauguration that same month, President Lee Jae-myung said he would stay in the Yongsan office until the presidential office is relocated to Cheong Wa Dae. On 1 August 2025, Cheong Wa Dae closed to public for maintenance ahead of return of the presidential office.

On 8 December 2025, the presidential office officially began its relocation back to Cheong Wa Dae. The transfer was finished on 29 December, with President Lee reporting for work at the residence that day.

== Identity and amenities ==
=== Logo ===
The Cheong Wa Dae logo was first enacted in 1995 during the Kim Young-sam administration. The logo was modified in 2005 during the Roh Moo-hyun administration. In 2008, with the inauguration of the Lee Myung-bak government, a new logo was released. In 2013, a new logo was released with the launch of Park Geun-hye's government and was used until the end of Moon Jae-in's government in 2022.

1995–2005

2005–2008

2008–2013

2013–2022, 2025–present

Cheong Wa Dae has a land area of 253,505 m^{2} and a floor space of 76,685 pyeong. At the time of the Japanese colonial era, the site area of the Governor-General's office was 644,337 m^{2}, but after liberation, it was reduced to 230,980 m^{2}, and then increased to the current level with the expansion of related buildings and facilities such as security. 73 parcels belong to Cheong Wa Dae, including Sejong-ro 1, 157-94 Samcheong-dong, and 9 other parcels, Sejong-ro 1-91 and 17 parcels, and Gungjeong-dong 1–2, and 43 parcels.

From December 2007 to February 2008, the Munhwa Broadcasting Corporation covered the leaders of the Roh Moo Hyun government who were about to retire and made the last 100 days of the regime a documentary about Cheong Wa Dae. The program captured secret stories from the main building, where the president's office is located, to the official residence and the Yeomingwan. Lee Myung-bak also made and released his documentary video shortly before his retirement, and the interior of Cheong Wa Dae, including the official residence, was also released to some extent. Moon Jae-in opened the office to commemorate the 100th day since his presidency.

=== Main building ===
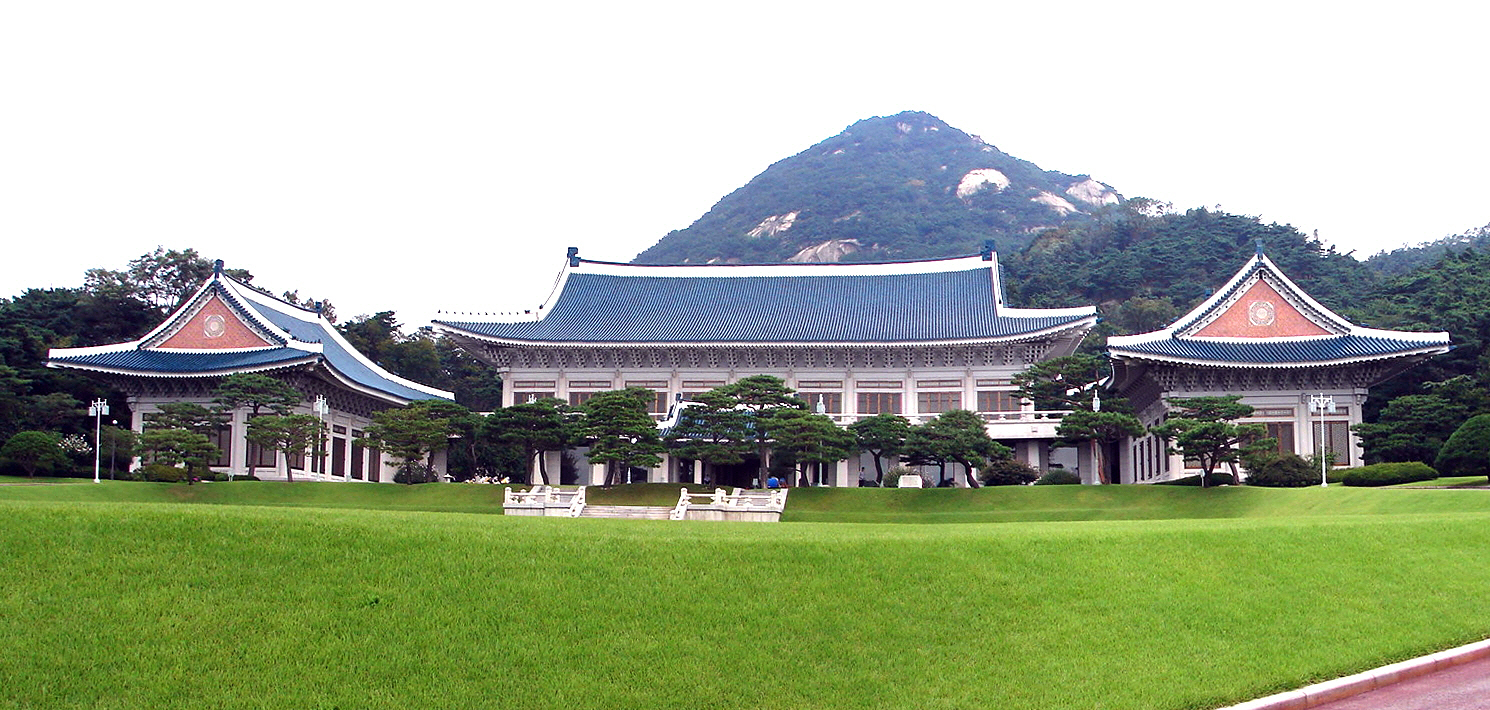
The Main Building of Cheong Wa Dae

The main building (본관; 本館; bongwan) was built in September 1991 and used for the president's office. There was also criticism that the space was larger than necessary and that it was closer to a building for protocol than a space for work and communication, so when President Moon Jae-In took office, he decided to see only official work here. The main gate of Cheong Wa Dae is called the 11th gate; it is a place where ministers and officials of higher rank enter during the Cabinet meetings. The interior was partially unveiled on the day of Moon Jae-In's inauguration.

The main building is based on traditional wooden structures and palace architecture. It has single-story annexes arranged on the left and right sides and 150,000 Korean blue tiles on the second floor.

On the first floor of the main building, there is the First Lady's office, the Mugunghwa Room, a reception room, and the Inwang Room used for small lunches, dinners, and refreshments. The second floor features the president's office, reception room, and a white room where people eat. The lawn in front of the building includes a state welcome event, a military honor guard, and a traditional funeral. Sejong Room, a separate building on the west side, was the venue for Cabinet meetings and appointment award events, while Chungmu Room, a separate building on the east side, was the venue for medium-sized lunches, dinners, and meetings.

Main Hall
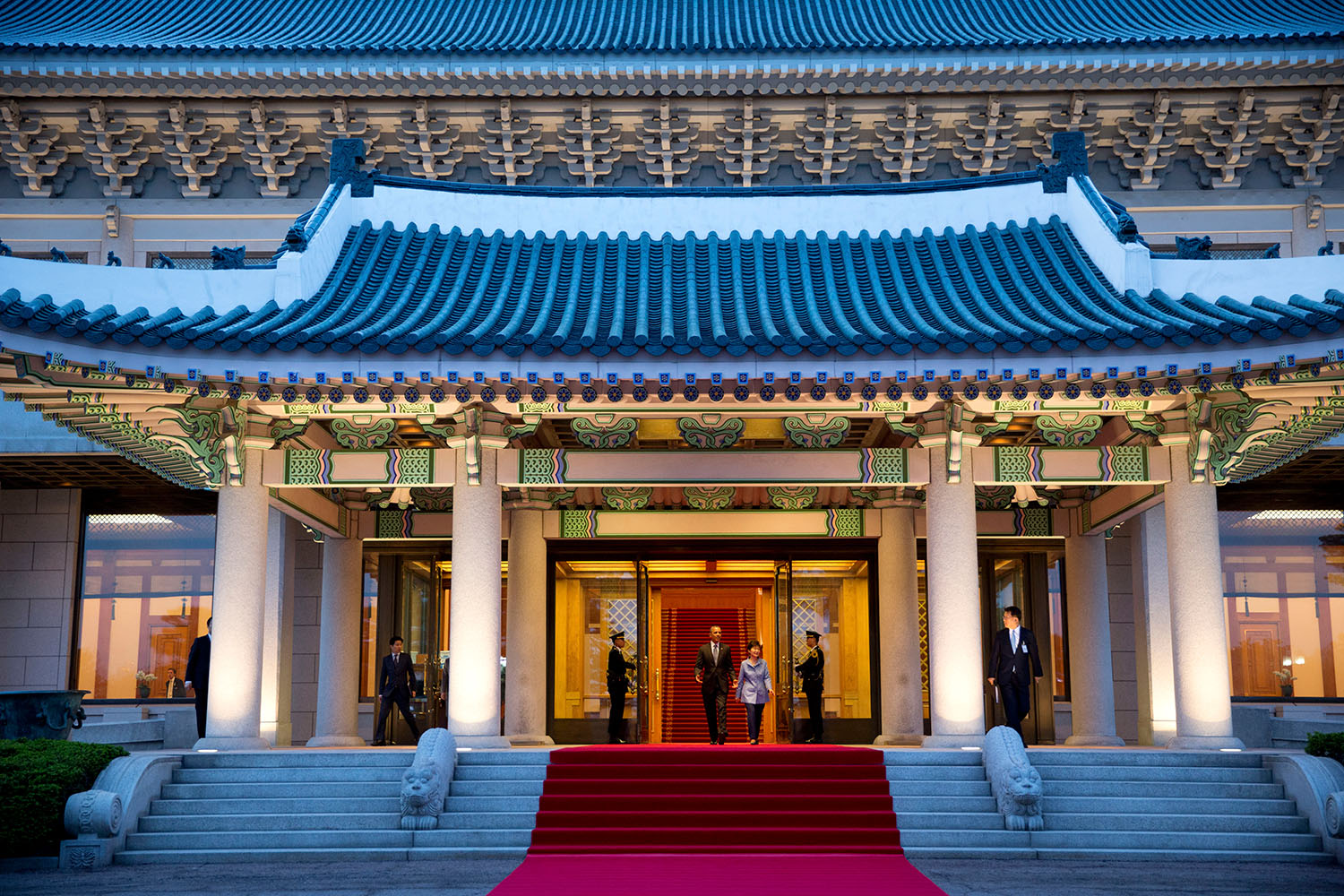
First floor entrance

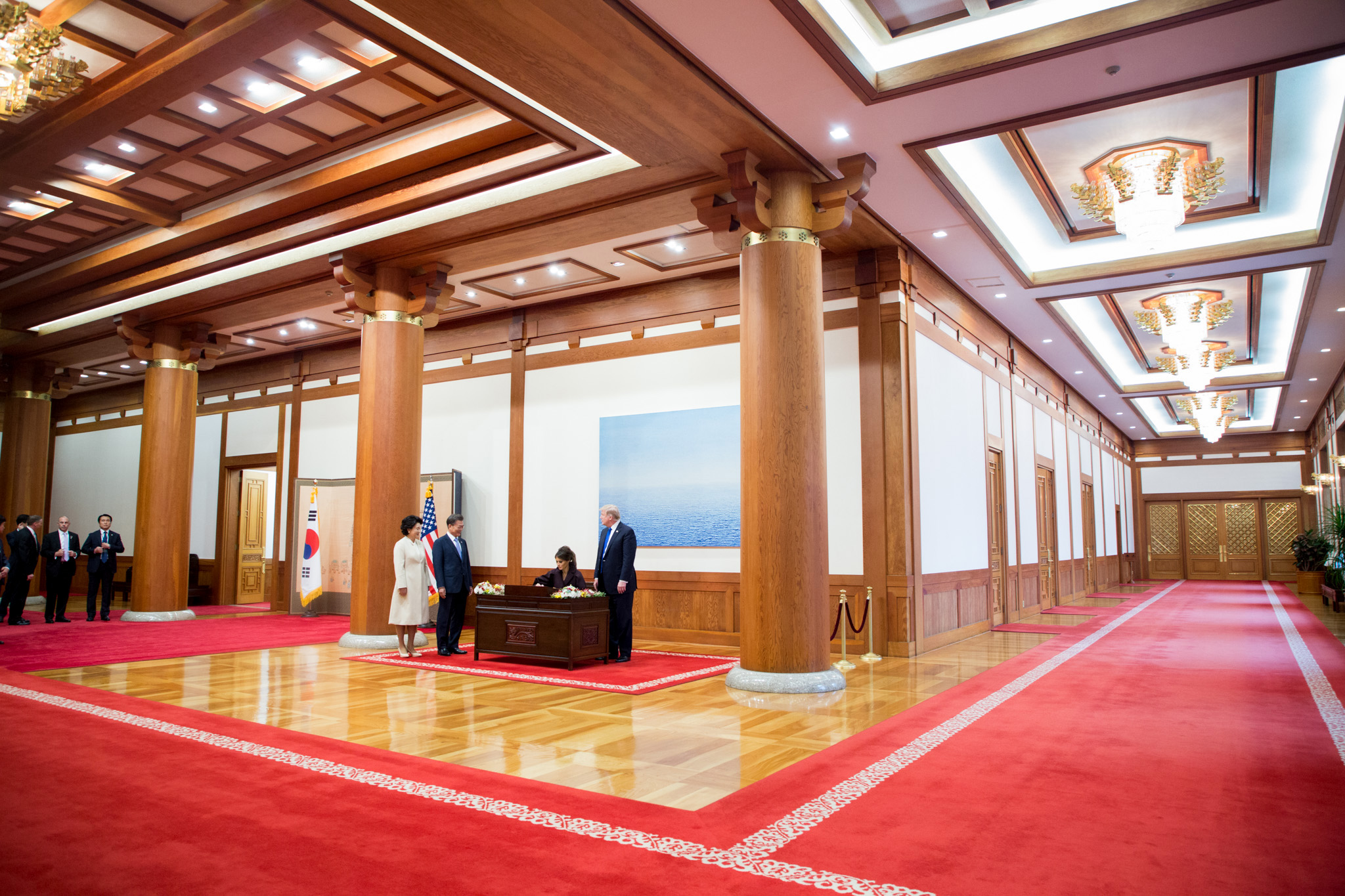
Lobby on the first floor

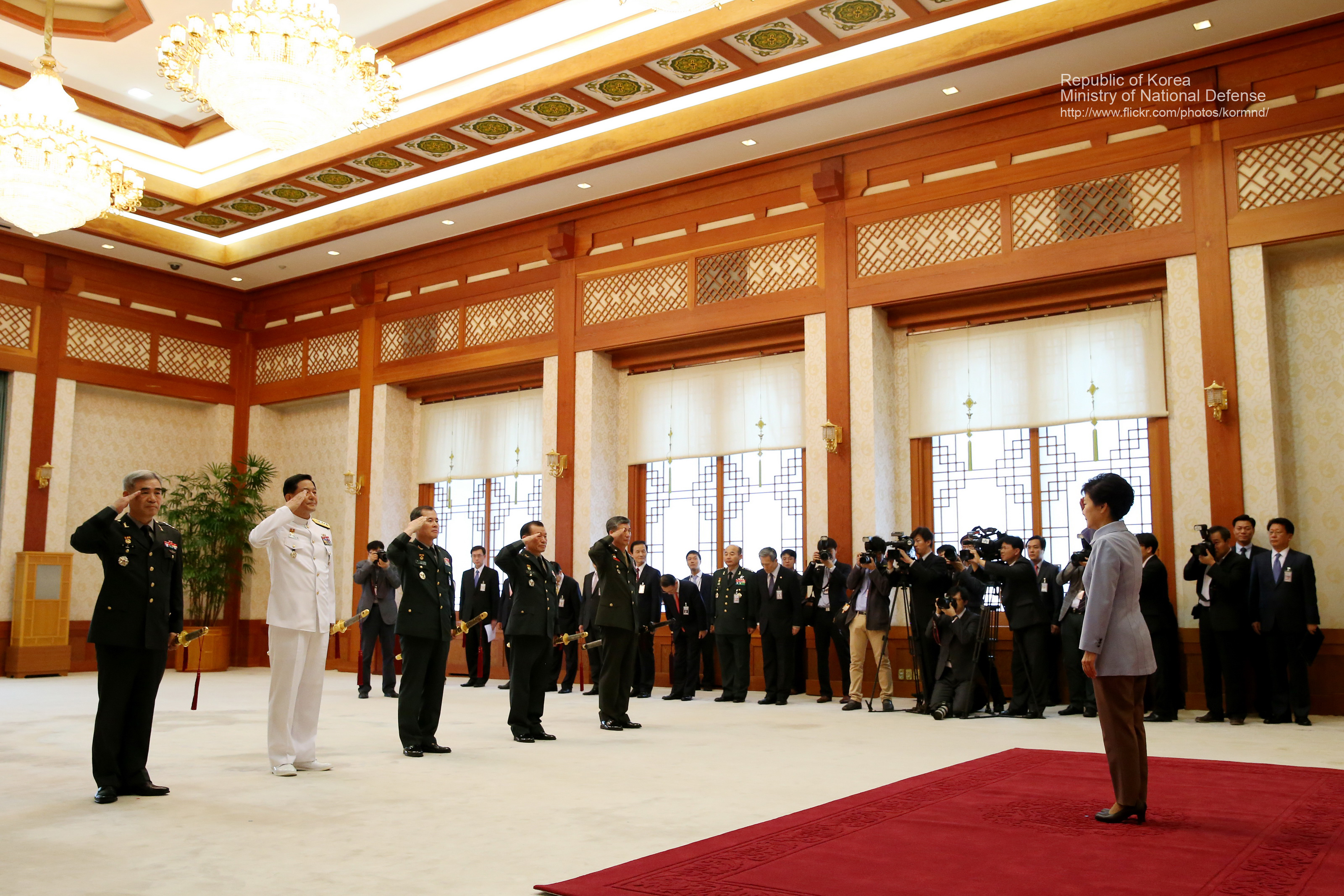
Chungmu Room

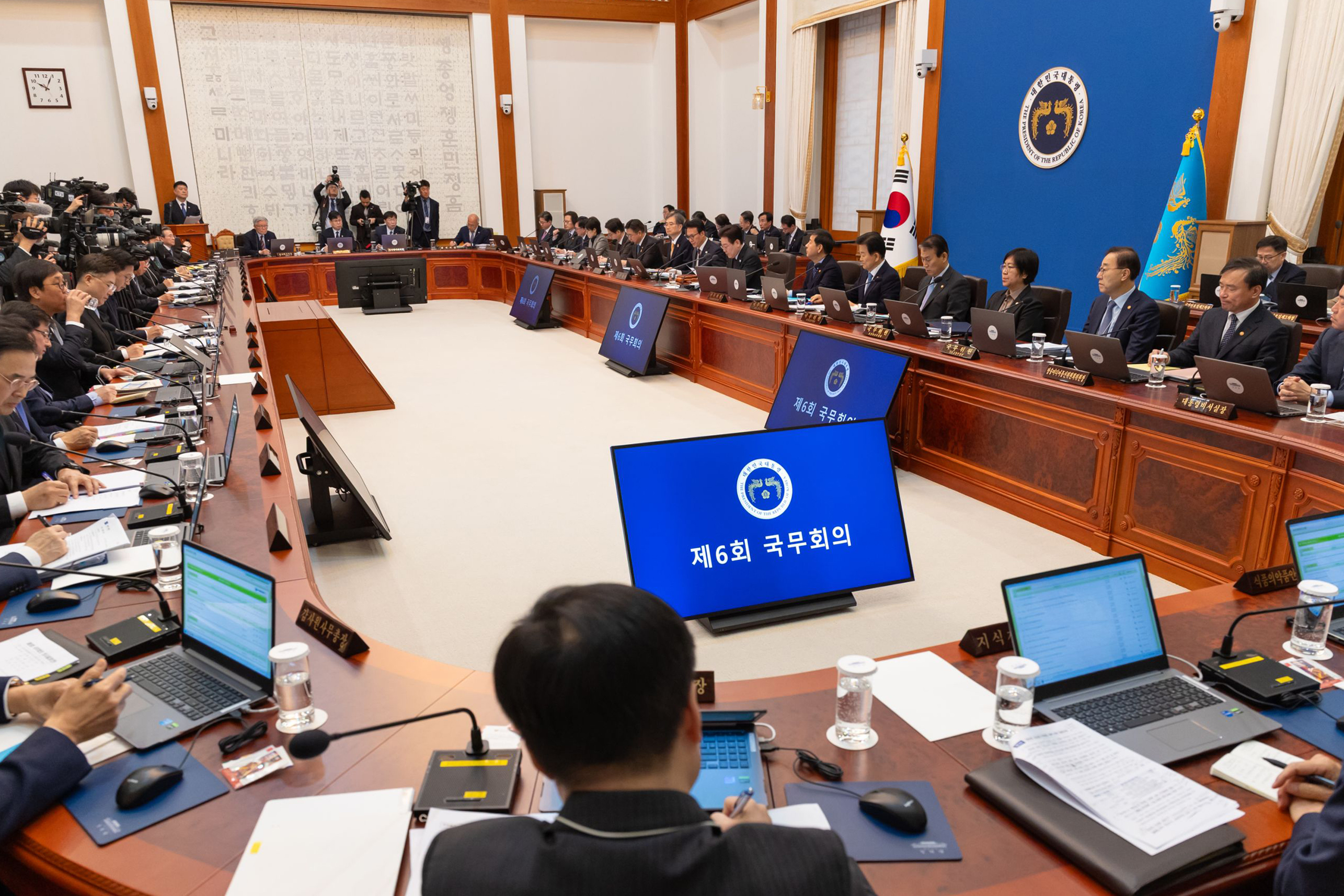
Cabinet meeting room

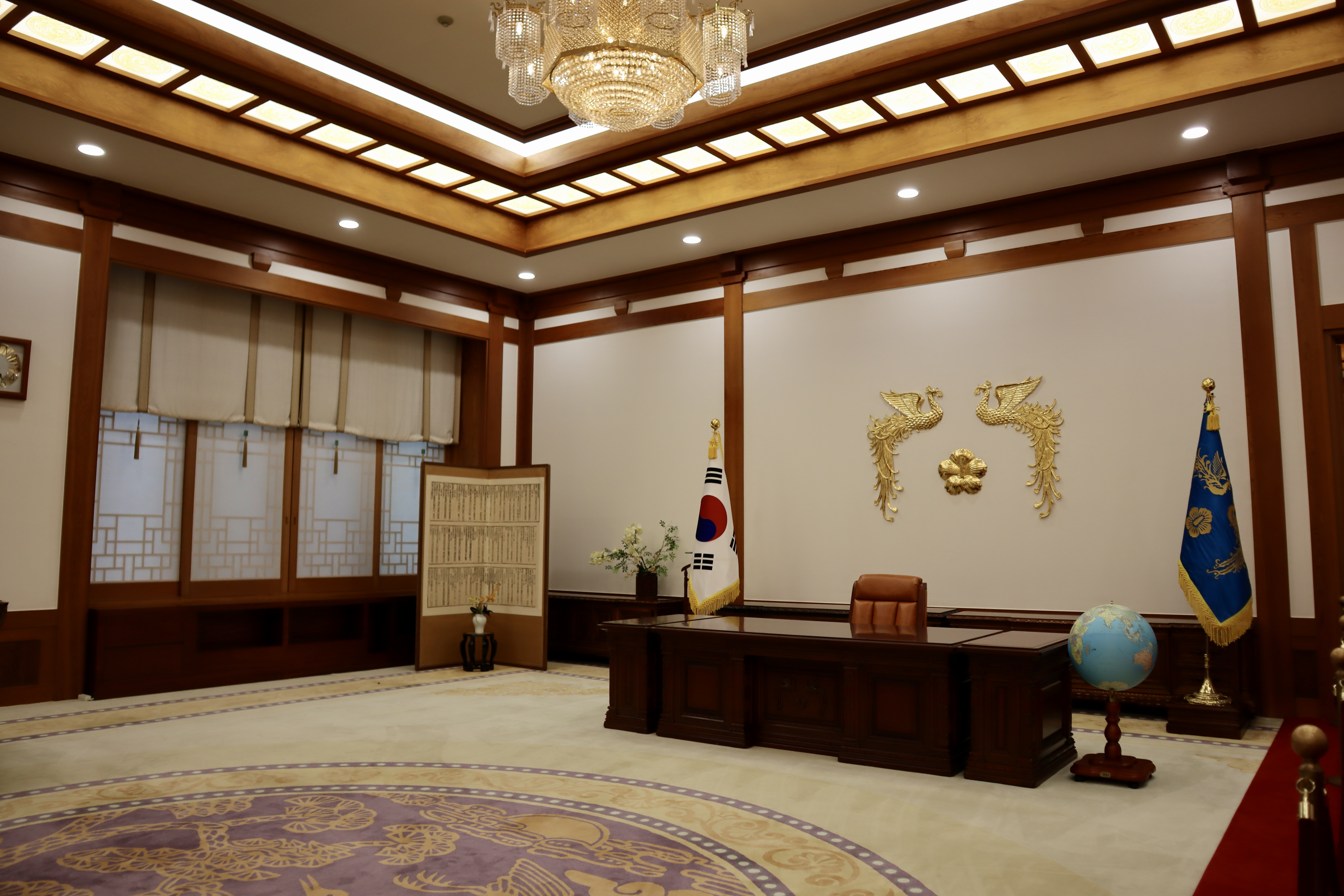
Cheong Wa Dae Presidential Office

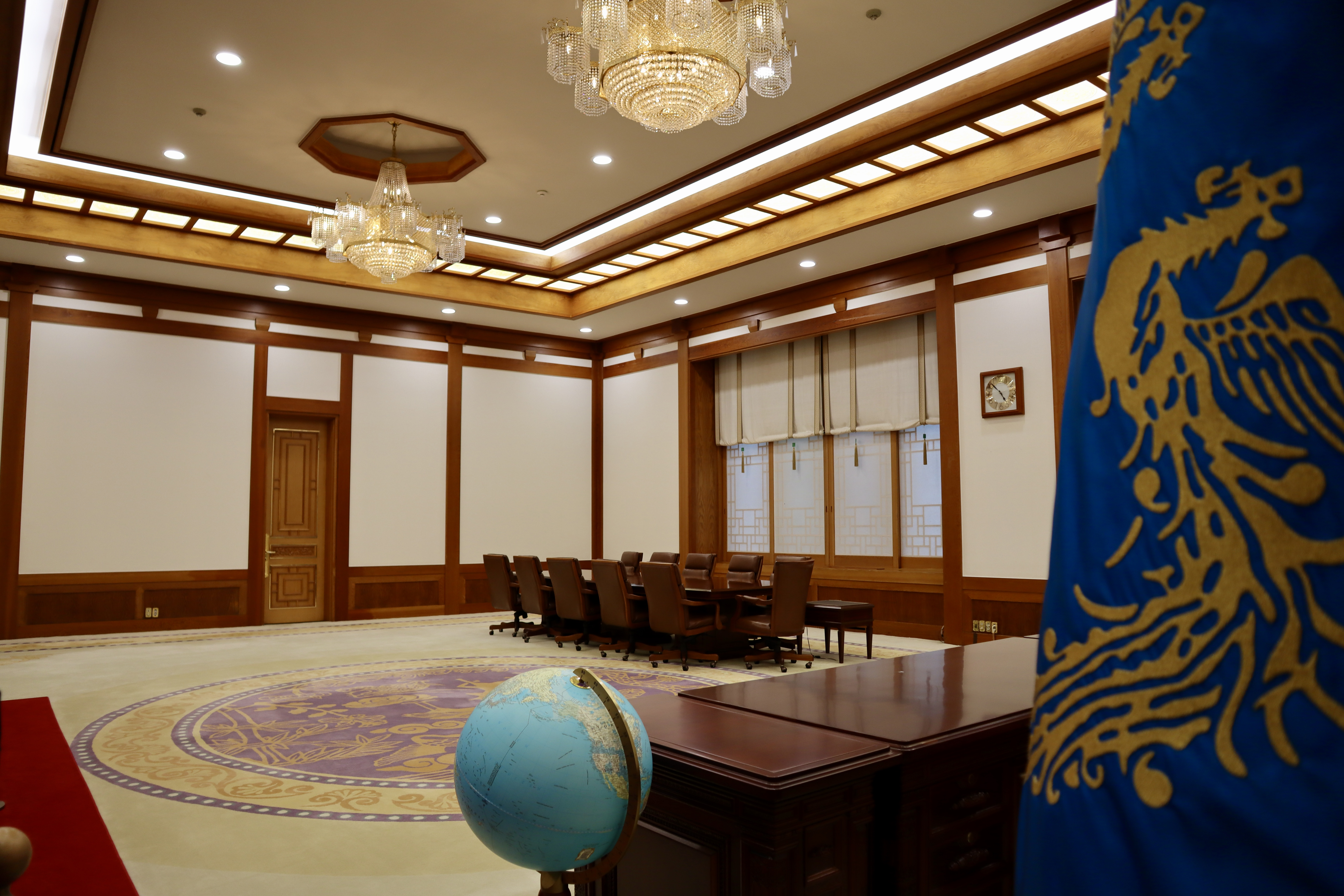
Cheong Wa Dae Presidential Office

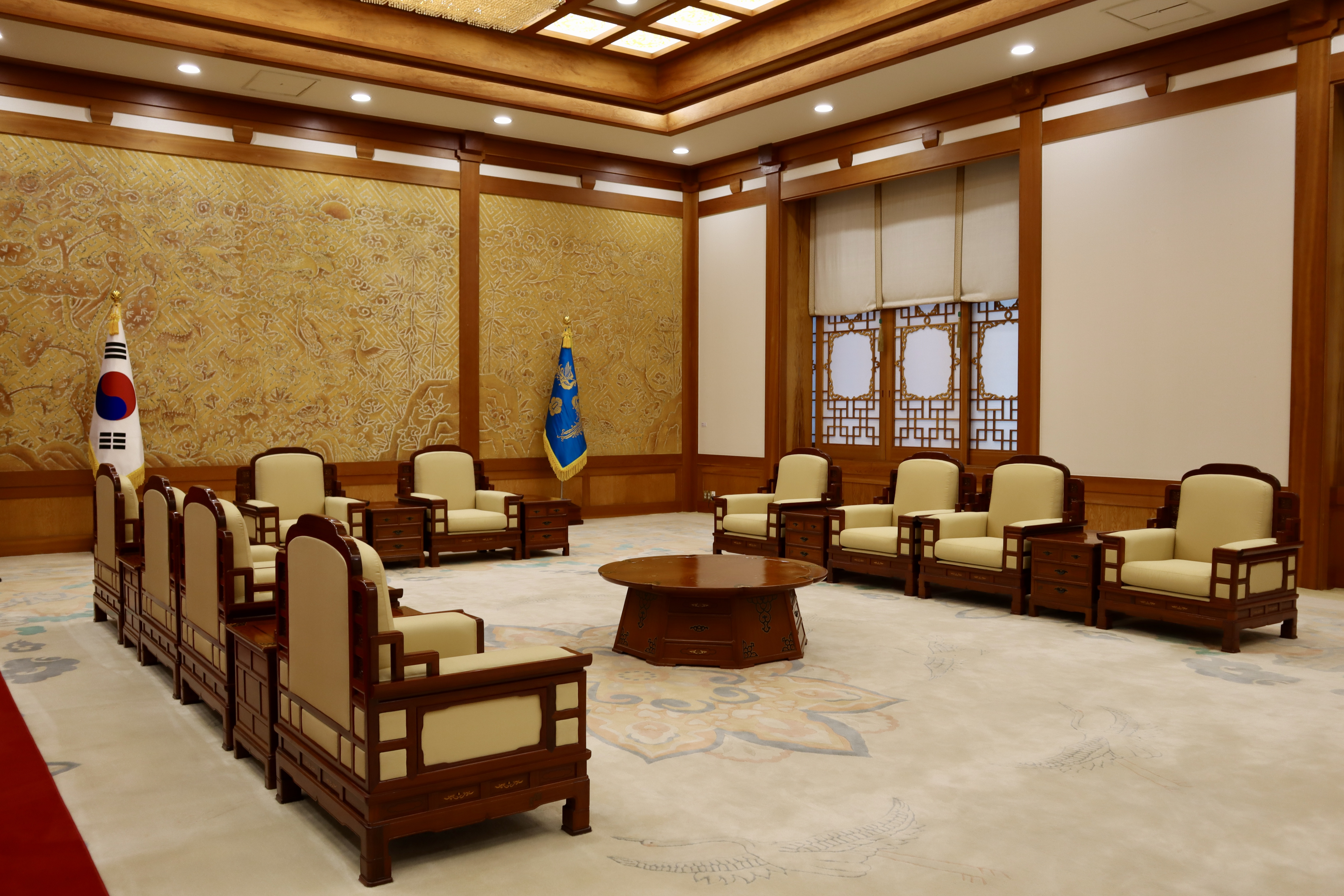
Cheong Wa Dae Presidential Reception Room

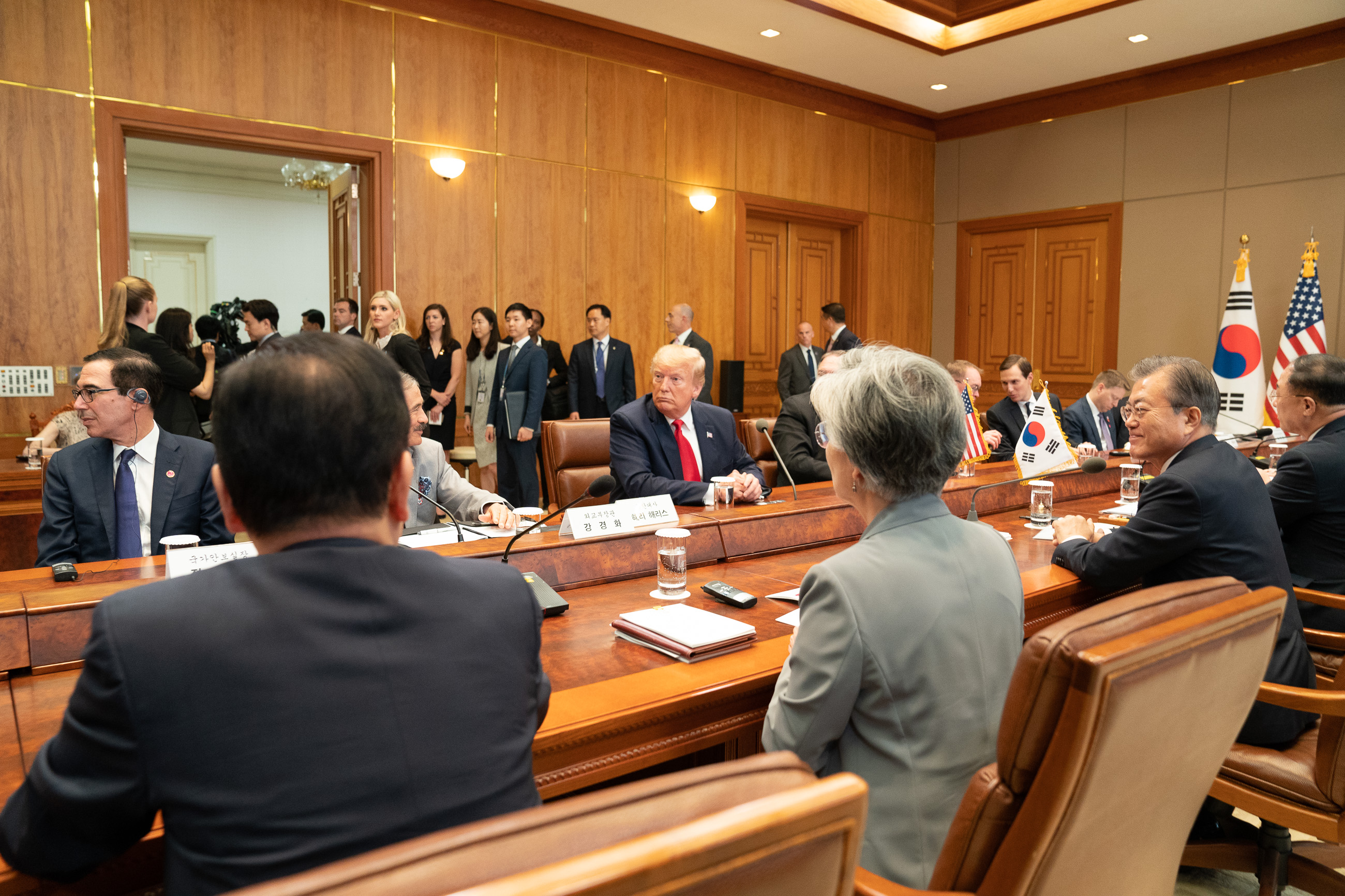
Jiphyeon Room

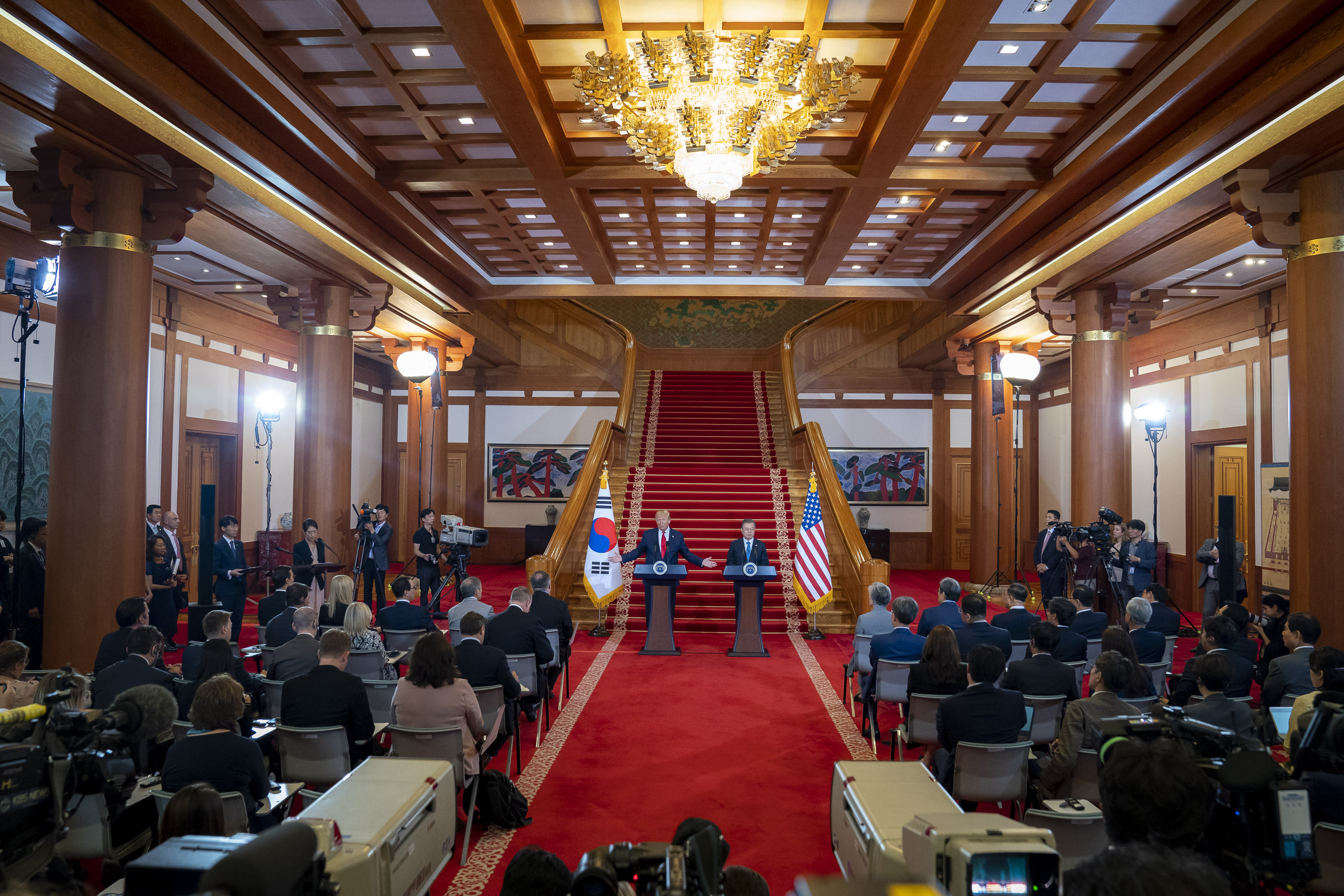
Central staircase

=== Yeongbingwan ===
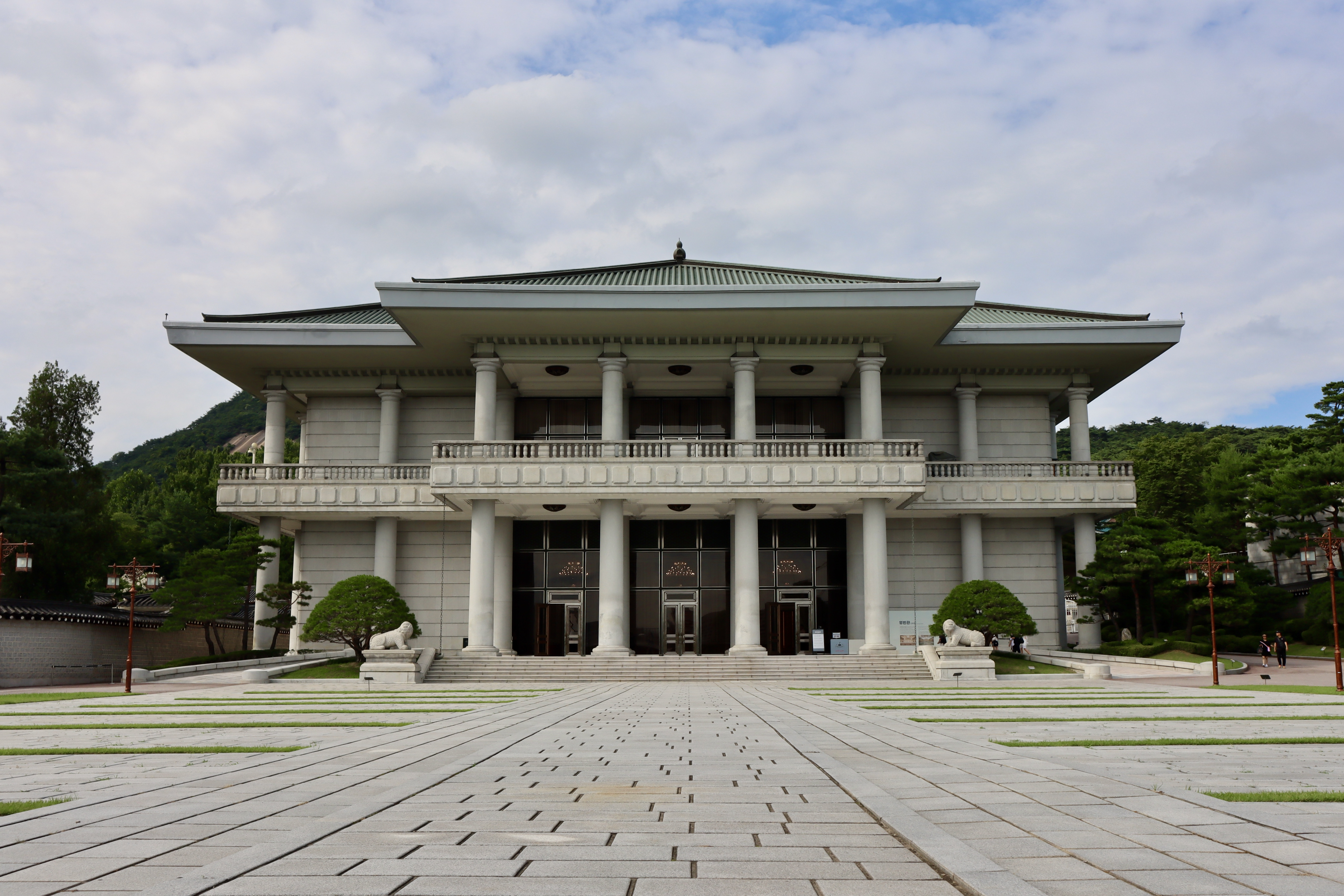
Cheong Wa Dae Yeongbingwan

The Yeongbingwan or the guest house (Korean: 영빈관; Hanja: 迎賓館; RR: Yeongbin-gwan) was completed in December 1978 as a building for large-scale meetings, welcoming foreign state guests, and various official events. It is currently the oldest modern building in the Cheong Wa Dae complex. The first floor is a reception area for foreign guests as a reception room, and the second floor is a place where large-scale luncheon and dinner events are held, decorated with Mugunghwa and laurel trees. However, it is said that the use is not strictly divided. The capacity is about 250 people, but there are no separate accommodations and not enough decorations or facilities to feel Korean style; it is close to a huge banquet hall used as a venue for a luncheon.

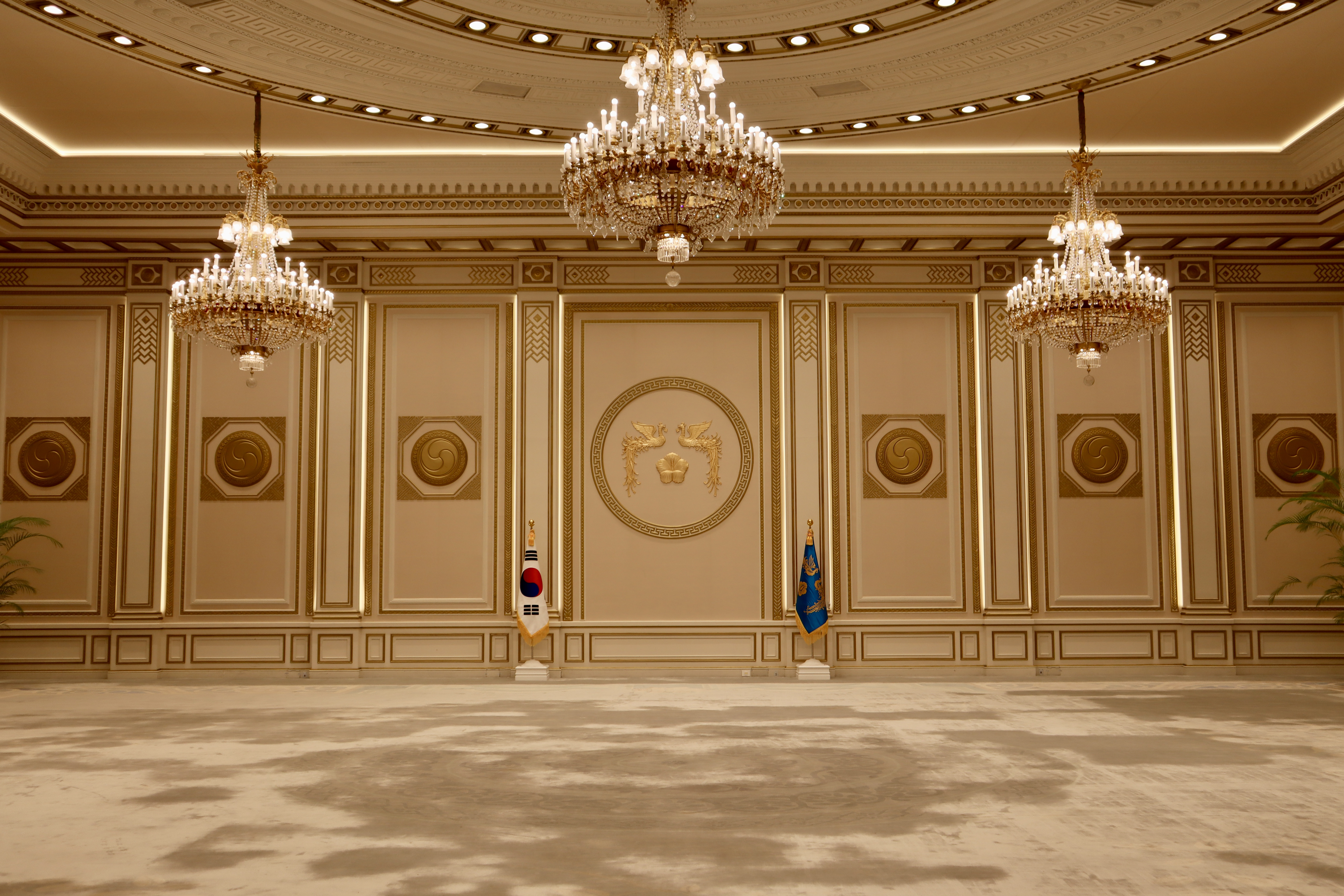
Inside the Cheong Wa Dae guest house

In the past, there was no space in the Cheong Wa Dae to greet state guests. Therefore, the Chosun Hotel and Walkerhill Hotel were used, or the Korean house was used as a guest house. In 1958, the Syngman Rhee administration nationalized Jangchungdan Park to build a guesthouse and began construction. Construction was temporarily suspended due to the April 19 Revolution and the May 16 military coup, but the Shilla Hotel guesthouse was completed in February 1967. However, it was eventually sold to the public in 1973 and became the current Shilla Hotel.

As the event space at Cheong Wa Dae was not suitable for the national status, construction of the current guesthouse on the old site of Gyeongnongjae, began in January 1978. The guesthouse was completed at the end of that year; in October 1998, the surrounding old buildings were renovated and then re-renovated in June 2000.

=== Old residence ===
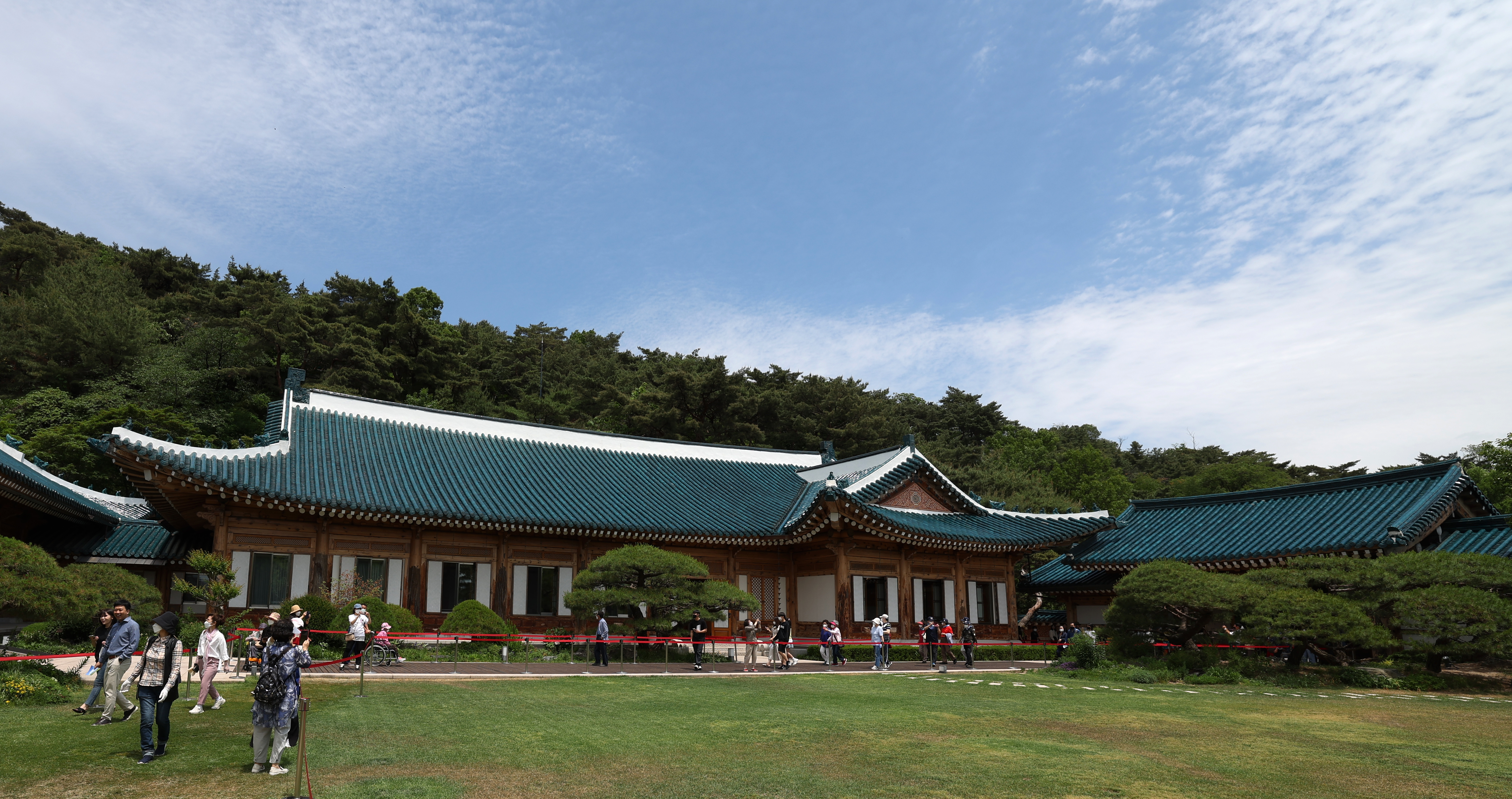
Cheong Wa Dae Presidential Residence

The old residence (Korean: 청와대 대통령 관저; Hanja: 靑瓦臺 大統領 官邸; RR: Cheong-wadae Daetongnyeong Gwanjeo) was completed in 1990 as the place where the president lived with his family. Although it was not well disclosed to reporters in the past, the entrance to the official residence was disclosed in March and November 2003, when Roh Moo-hyun was in office. Lee Myung-bak had also released images related to family life, and while president, Moon Jae-in made several public appearances on his way to work at the entrance of his official residence.

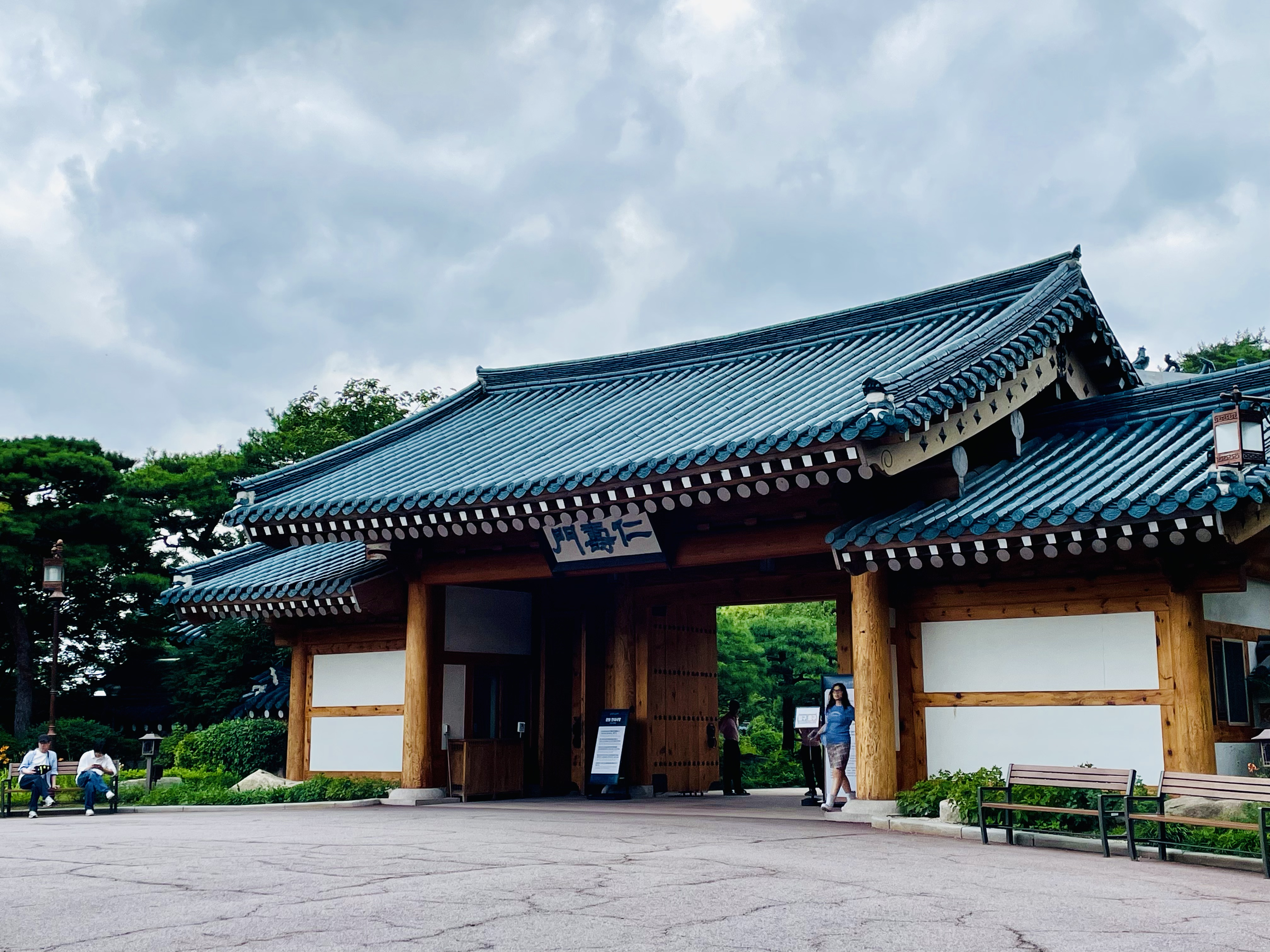
Insu Gate in Cheong Wa Dae

Park Geun-hye's daily life was revealed when Kim Mak-up, a contractor and butler when Park was in office, was investigated by prosecuters. At this time, the structure of the official residence was also known, and according to his statement, the official residence was divided into an inner room and an annex, and the annex was where the bodyguard resided. At that time, the interior had a bedroom, study, fitness room, newsroom, Korean room, powder room, etc., and the president's bedroom was equipped with a bed, dressing table, drawer, TV, desk, laptop, and intercom. The annex had a security room, a cooking room, a dining room, and a reception room which consisted of a meeting table, a round table, and a TV.

Presidents Chun Doo-hwan, Roh Tae-woo, and Roh Moo-hyun stayed at Cheong Wa Dae on the last day of their terms and left Cheong Wa Dae the next day. Kim Young-sam, Kim Dae-jung, and Lee Myung-bak left Cheong Wa Dae on the last day of their terms and served as presidents until midnight. Meanwhile, Choi Kyu-hah and Park Geun-hye stepped down before a successor was decided, both of whom stayed at Cheong Wa Dae for a few more days after their presidential terms ended. Previous presidents moved in at the same time as they took office, but Moon Jae-In did not move in until the third day of his inauguration due to facility maintenance. This was the first time since the completion of the official residence.

Before the construction of the current main building and official residence during Roh Tae-woo's presidency, the old main building's first floor served as the presidential office, while the second floor functioned as the presidential residence. It is said that during this period, there were two shutters on the stairs connecting these floors. Later, under Roh Tae-woo's government, the current official residence building was built behind the former main building, incorporating traditional architectural styles to maximize the function of the residential space. The layout included a main building for living space, an annex for hosting events, and the creation of traditional-style gardens and men's quarters in the front yard.

Near the official residence, there is a pavilion called Ounjeong and a building called Chimryugak. It was originally located at the current site of the official residence, but was moved to its current location during the new construction. In addition to the Ounjeong Pavilion, there were two to three pavilions in the Cheong Wa Dae precincts that have now been demolished. The date when both the Ounjeong Pavilion and the Chimryugak Pavilion were built is unknown. However, it seems that it was built afterwards, considering that neither building is mentioned in the shape of the northern palace, which is believed to have been built in 1907. Some say it was built during the Rhee Syngman era, but the signboard of Oh Un-Jeong is also handwritten by Syngman Rhee.

The so-called handsome stone Buddha, the stone seated Buddha of the square pedestal of Gyeongju, is also located around the official residence. As the name suggests, it was originally located in Gyeongju, but it is said that Governor Masatake Terouchi moved to the governor's residence during the Japanese colonial period. When the official residence was newly built in the 1930s, the Buddha statue was also moved, and in 1989, when the official residence of the Cheong Wa Dae was newly built, it moved back to its current position.

With the inauguration of President Yoon Suk Yeol on 10 May 2022, it lost its function as an official residence and was changed to an old residence.

=== Yeomingwan ===
Yeomingwan (Korean: 여민관; Hanja: 與民館) is the place where Cheong Wa Dae aides work and is divided into three buildings. It was changed to Wiminkwan during the presidency of Lee Myung-bak. When President Moon Jae-in took office, it was returned to Yeomingwan, the name of the expansion during the Roh Moo-hyun regime. Yeomingwan is taken from Yeomin Dongrak, a phrase from Mencius, and means "to share joy with the people". On the other hand, Wimin speculates that it means 'politics for the people'. Shortly after its launch, the Moon Jae-in government initially considered retaining the name "Women's Hall" but ultimately reverted to "Yeomin Hall." It aimed to prevent any suggestion of hierarchy, ensuring the people were not perceived as subordinate to Cheong Wa Dae.

The main building and Yeomingwan are about 500m away. Roh Moo-hyun envisioned a Korean-style West Wing while constructing Yeomin Hall 1, and frequently worked there. However, in the second half of his administration, he preferred the office of the main building, and Lee Myung-bak also received reports from the office of the Yeomingwan three or four times. Park Geun-hye did not visit the office of Yeomingwan during her presidency, but Moon Jae-in worked at Yeomingwan again.

The construction of Yeomin Hall 1 began in May 2004 and was completed in December. It has a floor space of 974 pyeong with one basement floor and three ground floors. The Chief of Staff's office and the State Affairs Office are located on the second floor, and the President's simple office, small meeting room, and conference room are located on the third floor. Before the establishment of Yeomin Hall 1, Yeomin Hall 2 was referred to as an annex, while Yeomin Hall 3 was known as Dong Annex. Completed in 1969 and 1972, respectively, both are older structures. Following a safety assessment rating them as a D-grade, the National Assembly prioritized budget allocation for repair work. The Bluehouse Library is located in Yeomin Hall 2, and as of January 2018, there are 18,662 books. Books can only be rented, and the library receives applications every month and purchases books after an internal review.

=== Sugungteo ===
Sugungteo Site (Korean: 수궁터; Hanja: 守宮터) was named because the former main building, the official building of the Governor-General of Joseon during the Japanese colonial period, was demolished in November 1993 and restored to its old state. In addition, information boards and commemorative stones of the old main building were made to inform visitors of the origin of the Sugung site.

=== Sangchunjae ===
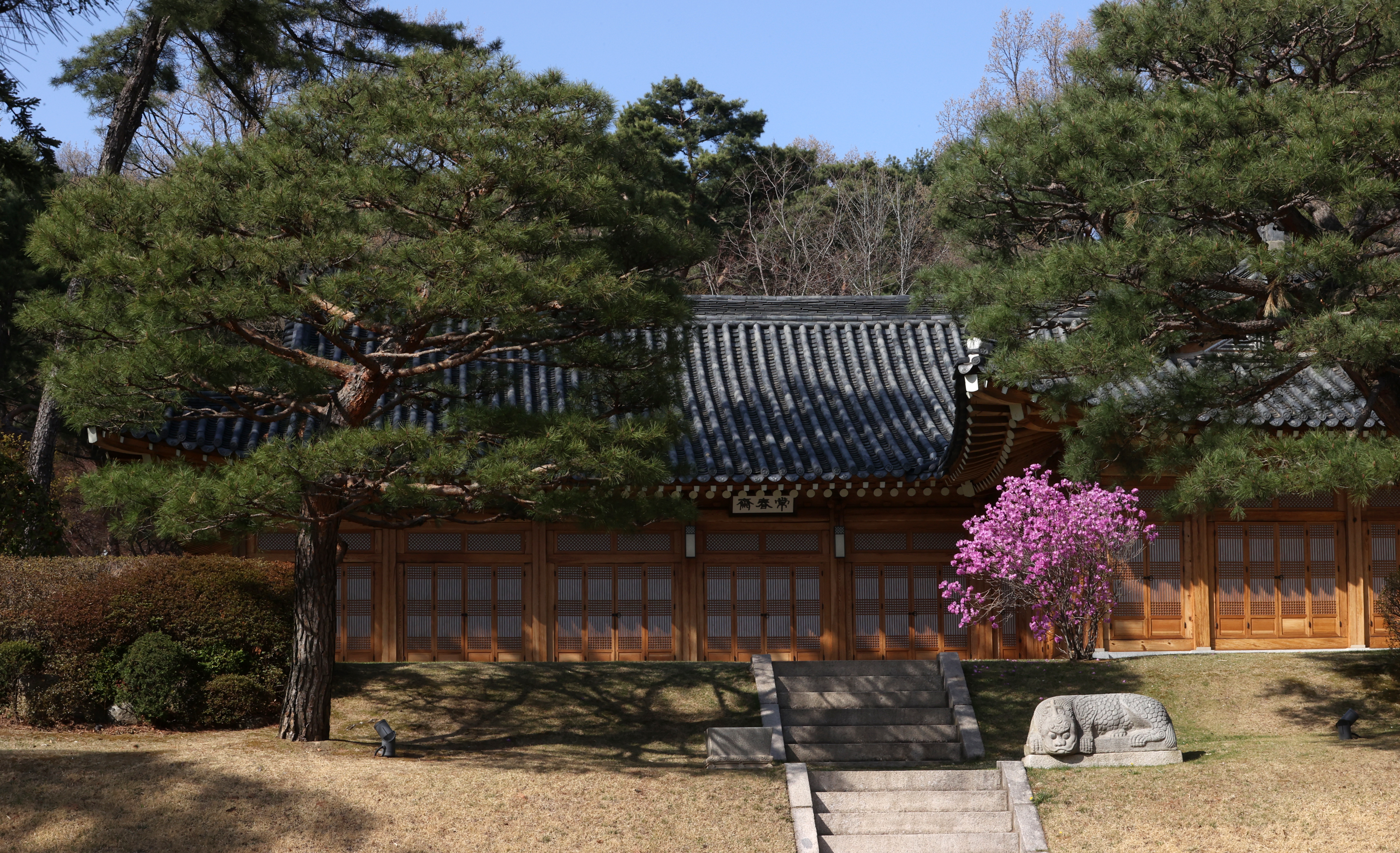
Sangchunjae

Sangchunjae (Korean: 상춘재; Hanja: 常春齋) is a traditional hanok located behind Nokjiwon, the garden of Cheong Wa Dae, and is used for foreign guests. The meaning of Sangchunjae is "a house where spring always continues". The current site of Sangchunjae Pass was the site of an annex called Maehwasil, a Japanese-style wooden building during the Japanese colonial period. It was about 66 square meters in size. After the establishment of the government, it was changed to Sangchunsil, which was used as a ritual building for refreshments and dinner events. Later, in March 1978, Sangchunsil was demolished and Sangchunjae, a 73m^{2} natural slate roof-style wooden building, was built. In November 1982, the existing Sangchunjae Pass was demolished, and a 417.96m^{2} hanok was completed in half a year, taking its current shape. It is the first traditional hanok built in the Cheong Wa Dae precincts, and it is said to have used Chunyangmok (Content 4), which is more than 200 years old. Inside, there is a living room made of Daecheongmaru and two ondol rooms.

Chun Doo-hwan is said to have frequently met foreign guests and held informal meetings at Sangchunjae. Successive presidents also used it as a venue for informal meetings and meetings with foreign leaders. Park Geun-hye held a New Year's press conference at Sangchunjae for the first time in January 2017, when the impeachment trial was underway. After Moon Jae-In took office, Sangchunjae Pass underwent repair due to extensive moisture damage over time.

=== Nokjiwon ===
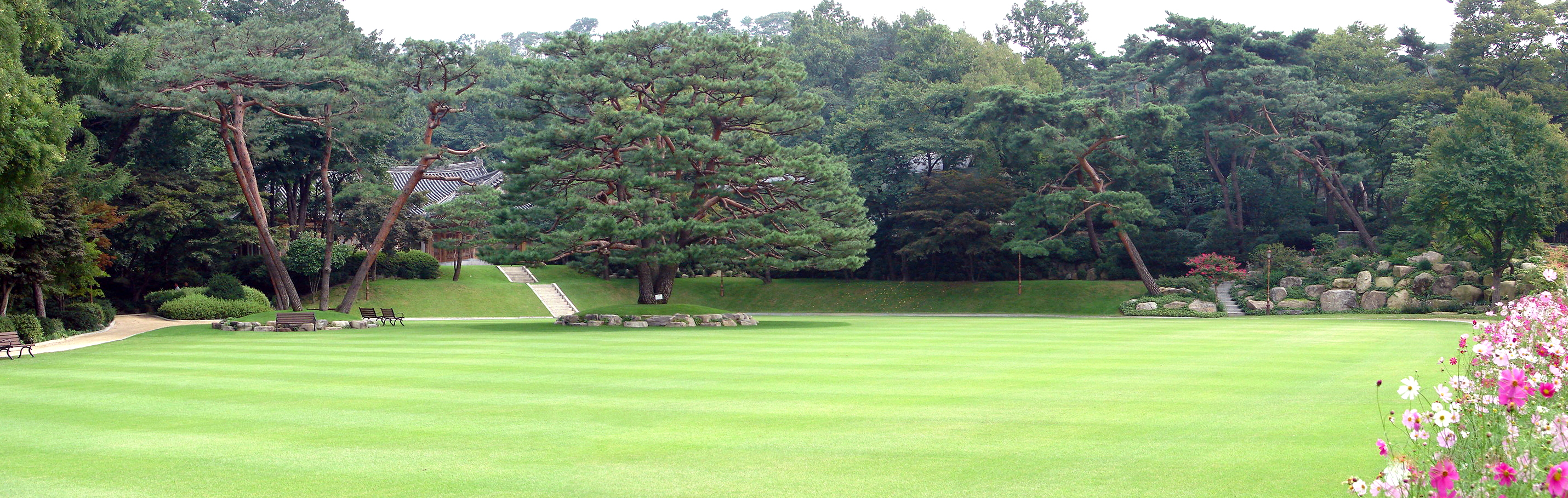
Nokjiwon

Nokjiwon (Korean: 녹지원; Hanja: 綠地園) is a garden in the Cheong Wa Dae precinct that has more than 120 species of trees. During the Japanese colonial period, it was the garden of the official residence of the Governor-General of Korea. It was also used as a site for livestock farms and greenhouses. After the establishment of the government in 1948, a garden was created when space was needed to function as an outdoor venue in Cheong Wa Dae. Initially, the green area was 5,289 m^{2}, but it was expanded to 5,620 m^{2} in 1985. Currently, Nokjiwon is holding various events such as Children's Day, Parents' Day, and the Day of Persons with Disabilities.

=== Chunchugwan ===
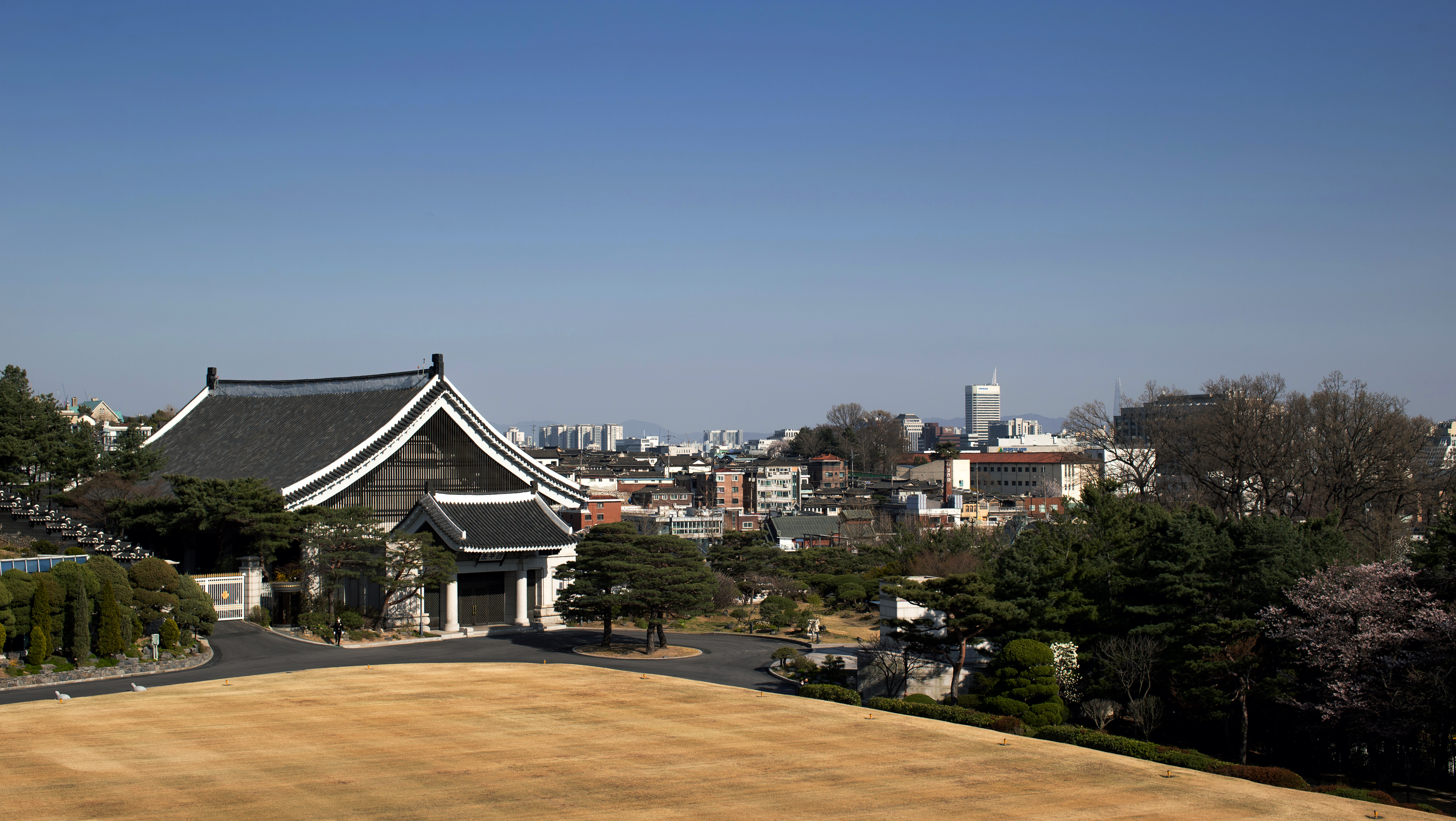
Chunchugwan

Chunchugwan (Korean: 춘추관; Hanja: 春秋館) was completed in September 1990 as a venue for the president's press conference and a newsletter room for reporters. With a floor space of 1,028 pyeong, it has three stories above ground and one basement floor; the roof is covered with earthenware. The name Chunchugwan originated from the Goryeo and Joseon periods.

Until the Kim Dae-jung government, reporters could freely go to the secretariat building in Cheong Wa Dae to cover the secretary. Since the Roh Moo Hyun administration, security measures have strengthened, resulting in a complete ban on reporters accessing Cheong Wa Dae grounds; it can only be covered by the Spring and Autumn Hall.

Briefings by Cheong Wa Dae officials now take place at Chunchugwan. Under a press pool system, representatives cover events and share content, imposing significant restrictions on Cheong Wa Dae coverage.

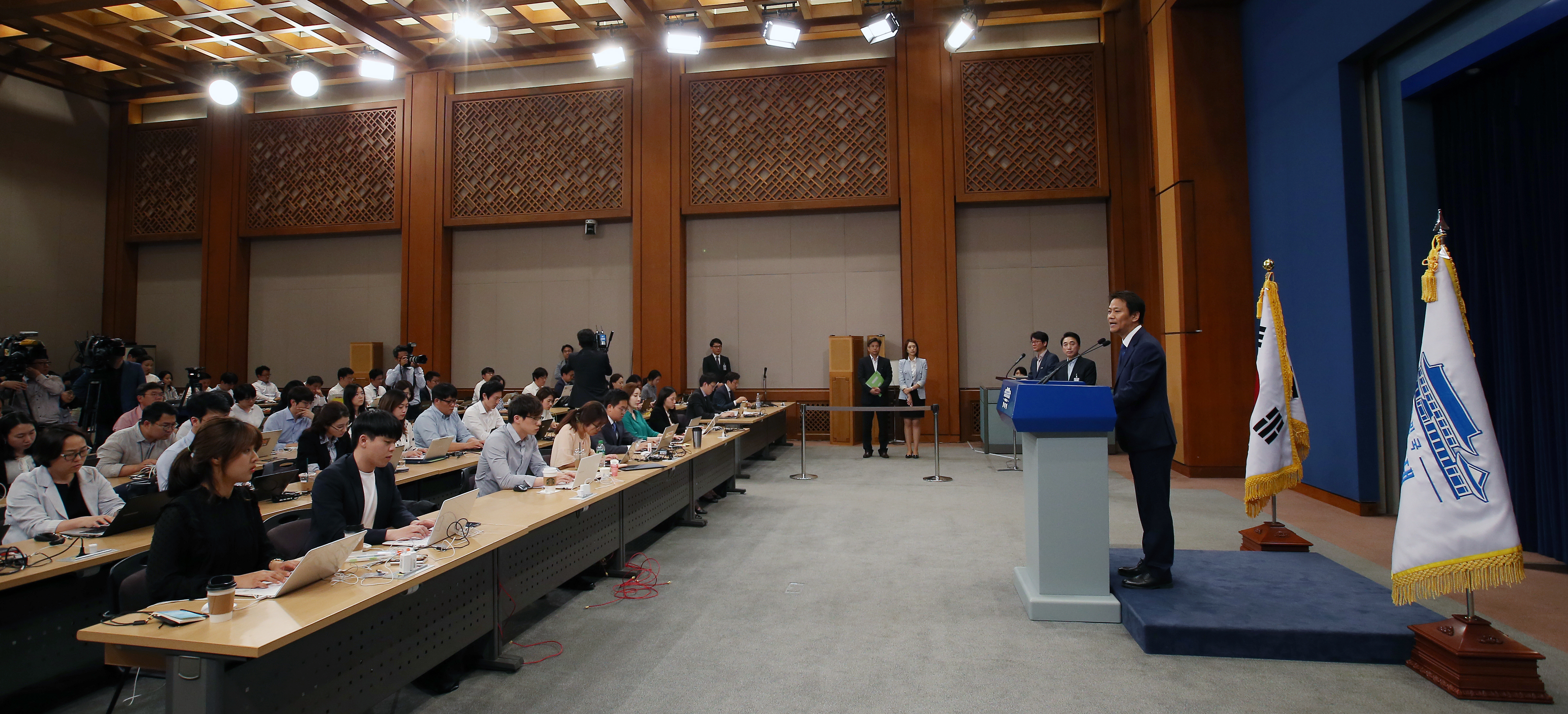
Interior of the Chunchugwan

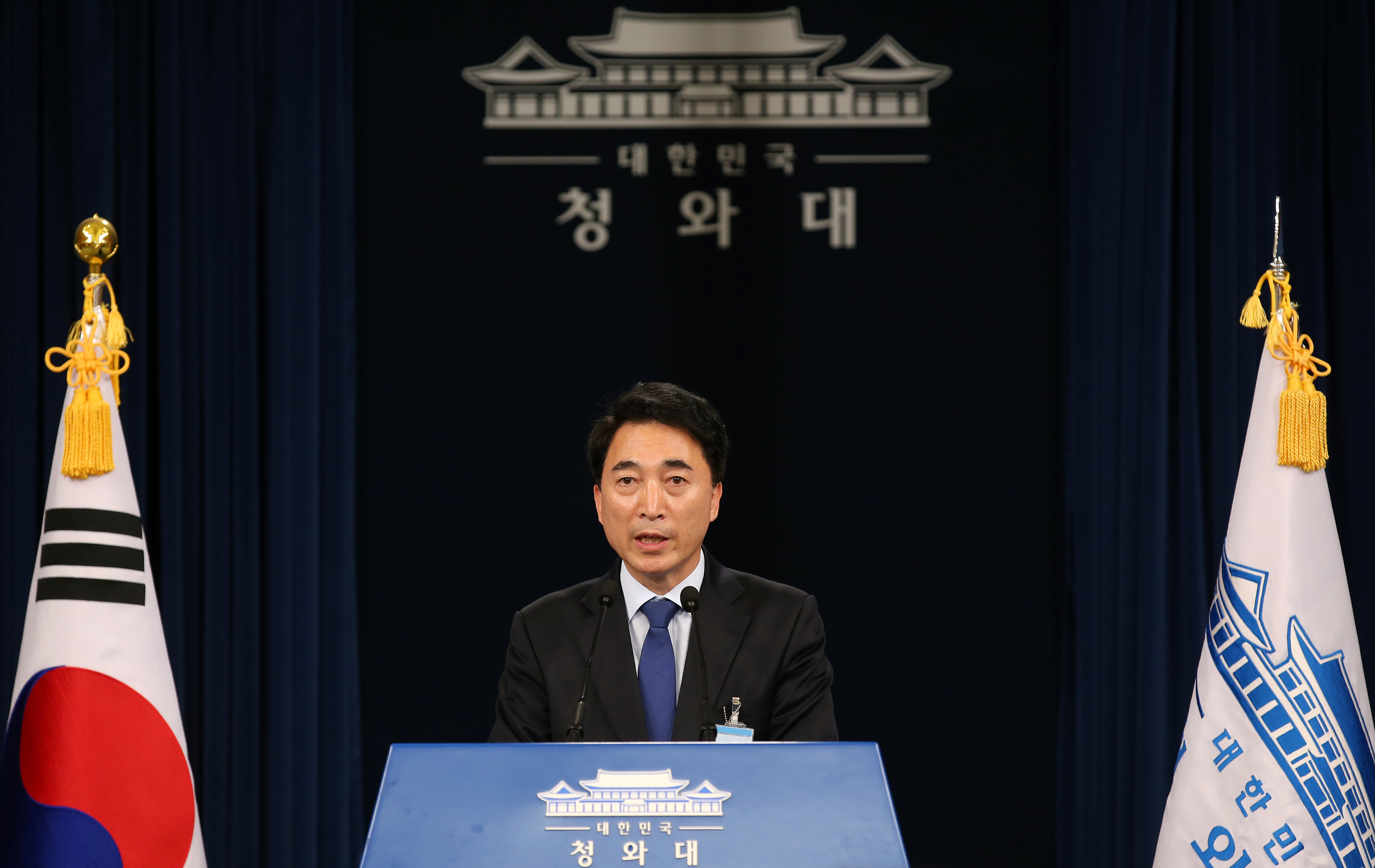
Press Briefing

=== Mugunghwa Dongsan park ===
Mugunghwa Dongsan (Korean: 무궁화동산; Hanja: 無窮花東山) is a civic park built after demolishing five KCIA safe houses in July 1993. The park is 10,560 m,^{2} it faces Cheong Wa Dae, and the back gate faces Changchangmun. In the middle is a central square and a well. A stone wall 30m long and 3m high is located at the site of the safe house where Park Chung Hee was assassinated.

=== Chilgung ===
Chilgung (Korean: 칠궁; Hanja: 七宮) is a Joseon-era shrine located right next to the Cheong Wa Dae guesthouse. It is called Chilgung because it enshrines the seven concubines who could not become queens. Due to the security of Cheong Wa Dae, only those who have applied to visit the Cheong Wa Dae are allowed to watch the commentary.

In the wake of the 21 January incident, the north of Chilgung Palace was demolished to create a road; it was a habitual traffic accident area, but it was also aimed at strengthening the security of Cheong Wa Dae. Due to this construction, Jeogyeonggung Palace and Daebingung Palace were moved to their current positions. Chilgung Palace reopened to the public in connection with Cheong Wa Dae visits in 2001.

=== Seobyeolgwan ===
Seobyeolgwan (Korean: 서별관; Hanja: 西別館) is a meeting-only building located on the west side of the main building of Cheong Wa Dae, facing Chunchugwan with a heliport in between. Yeonpungmun Gate, located right in front of it, is a place where Cheong Wa Dae employees enter and outsiders enter.

Secret meetings known as the "Seobyeolgwan Conference" were frequently held within the Cheong Wa Dae, because its secure location and lack of access records maintained confidentiality. Originating in 1997 to address the IMF economic crisis, it has since been used in many governments. In October 2002, during a hearing on remittance to North Korea, Rep. Uhm Ho-sung of the Grand National Party publicly referenced the conference for the first time. During the Lee Myung-bak administration, there were weekly discussions on economic matters that occurred under the banner of a macro-policy council, involving key figures such as the deputy prime minister for economic affairs, the governor of the Bank of Korea, the chairman of the Financial Services Commission, and the senior presidential secretary for economic affairs.

However, there was often criticism that it was a closed-door agreement because no records, including the duration of the meetings, were left. Controversy escalated when, during an annex meeting, 4.2 trillion won worth of funding was given by the Park Geun-hye government as a way to support Daewoo Shipbuilding & Marine Engineering. Criticism also mounted over the decision to set economic policies and determine the fate of insolvent conglomerates and banks at secret meetings. As a result, the Seobyeolgwan Conference, which was called the "hotbed of government administration", was no longer held after June 2016, but revived in December 2018 under the name of the Economic Coordination Conference after the inauguration of the Moon Jae-in government.

In November 2019, the interior structure of the annex was remodelled while keeping its appearance intact. It was an underdeveloped and closed building, and there was a lack of conference rooms in the Cheong Wa Dae precincts. The purpose was to relocate secretive meetings from the closed-door chamber to Yangji, converting it into a meeting venue accommodating both high-level and working-level officials. During the remodelling process, a name change was considered, but this was cancelled because "it could be an opportunity to change the name of Seobyeolgwan, which has been disgraced".

=== Sihwa and Yeonpung Gates ===
Sihwamun Gate (Korean: 시화문; Hanja: 時和門) and Yeonpungmun Gate (Korean: 연풍문; Hanja: 年豊門) are the doors of Cheong Wa Dae but are separated from the main gate. Yeonpungmun Gate served as a guide building for visitors to Cheong Wa Dae and was completed in February 2009. It is 859m^{2} in size with two floors above ground and one basement floor. On the first floor, there is a visitor information room, a rest room, an entrance gate, and the Nonghyup Blue House branch, and on the second floor, there is a book cafe and an interview room. It is an eco-friendly building with a geothermal system and a solar panel system.

Yeonpungmun Gate was also controversial as a place where various official and informal meetings were held and attended by Cheong Wa Dae officials. In 2009, there were suspicions that executives of three mobile carriers, SK Telecom, LG Uplus, and KT, were invited to contribute a large amount of funds, and a secret meeting attended by policy advisers such as defense, administrative safety, unification, and foreign trade was also held at Yeonpungmun. There was also talk that an official from the Mir Foundation participated in the Yeonpungmun meeting in 2016.

In 1970 an information room was established in Cheong Wa Dae. In August 2007, during the Roh Moo Hyun government, the 55-myeon meeting room and the 22 information room, which were the names of the information rooms at the time, have been changed to the Bukak information room and the fountain information room, respectively. These numbers were the numbers of the guard post where the information room was located, which was intended to be changed into soft, easy-to-understand words that could help visitors understand. After the inauguration of the Lee Myung-bak government, the existing information room, which had few convenience facilities other than two sofas, was extensively constructed to take its current shape. The names of the Bukak Information Room and the fountain Information Room were also changed to Yeonpungmun Gate and Sihwamun Gate, respectively, which were derived from Sihwa Yeonpung, meaning "opening the era of harmony and growing the economy every year". It also created a bank on the premises that visitors and employees could use, and Nonghyup was finally selected.

The main gate of Cheong Wa Dae is only available to a small number of people, including the president, foreign leaders, and Cabinet members; most Cheong Wa Dae employees enter through Yeonpungmun Gate or Sihwamun Gate. Sihwamun Gate, adjacent to Gyeongho-dong, is mainly used by bodyguards, and Yeonpungmun Gate, adjacent to Yeomingwan, is mainly used by secretarial staff.

=== Cheong Wa Dae Sarangchae ===
Cheong Wa Dae Sarangchae is a building built for tourists visiting Cheong Wa Dae and is a space that teaches Korean history and culture. Inside the building, there are artifacts related to past presidents and an exhibition hall. The history and old photos of Cheong Wa Dae, as well as the old photos and history of Gyeongbokgung, are all displayed there. In addition, visitors can purchase Korean foods and souvenirs.

On the first floor, there is a Korea Tourism Exhibition Hall, a souvenir shop, and a shelter, and on the second floor, there is a Cheong Wa Dae Hall and a public communication experience center.

Originally, this location was the presidential chief of staff's official residence, but when the front road of Cheong Wa Dae was opened in February 1996, it was changed into a complex cultural space to provide convenience and attractions for the people. At that time, it was called Hyoja-dong Sarangbang, and the building was remodelled in January 2010 due to aging; since then, it has kept its appearance and name. On the first floor, there were the National Public Relations Center and the Seoul Public Relations Center, and on the second floor, there were the Presidential Hall, the Government Public Relations Center, and the G20 Rest Area.

== Public access and security ==
=== Gallery ===
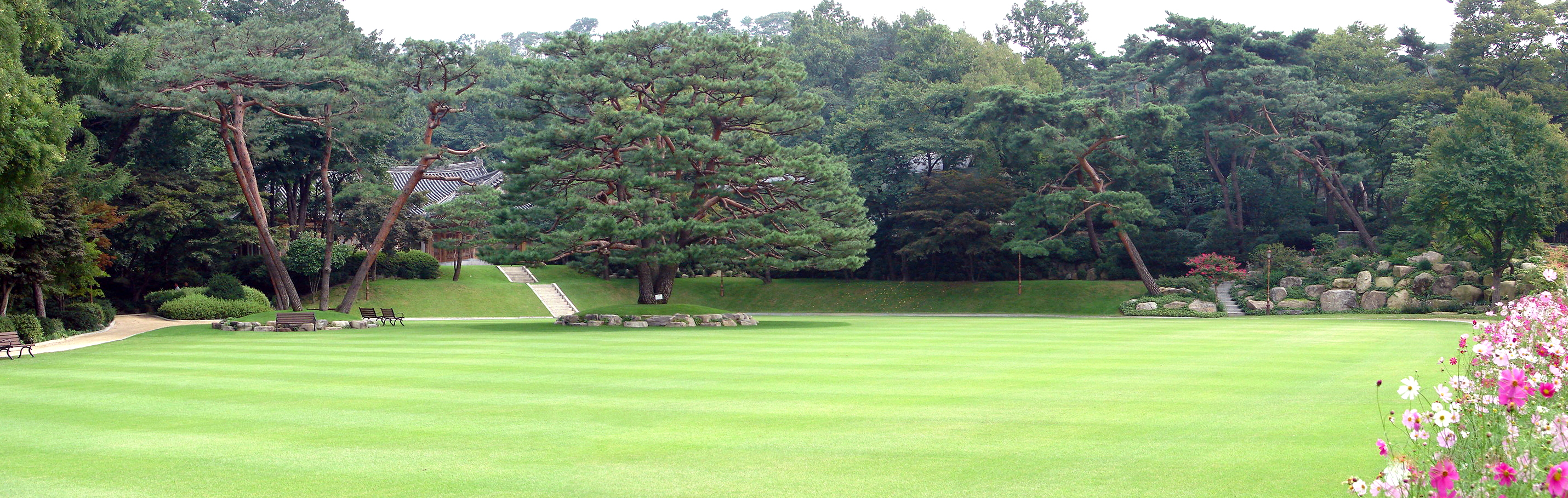
Gardens on the grounds of Cheong Wa Dae

To the north is the mountain Bukhansan, flanked by two mountains, Naksan, symbolizing the Azure Dragon, on the left and Inwangsan, symbolizing the White tiger, on the right. To the south is Namsan, the protective mountain of the capital. In front flow the Cheonggyecheon stream and Han River.

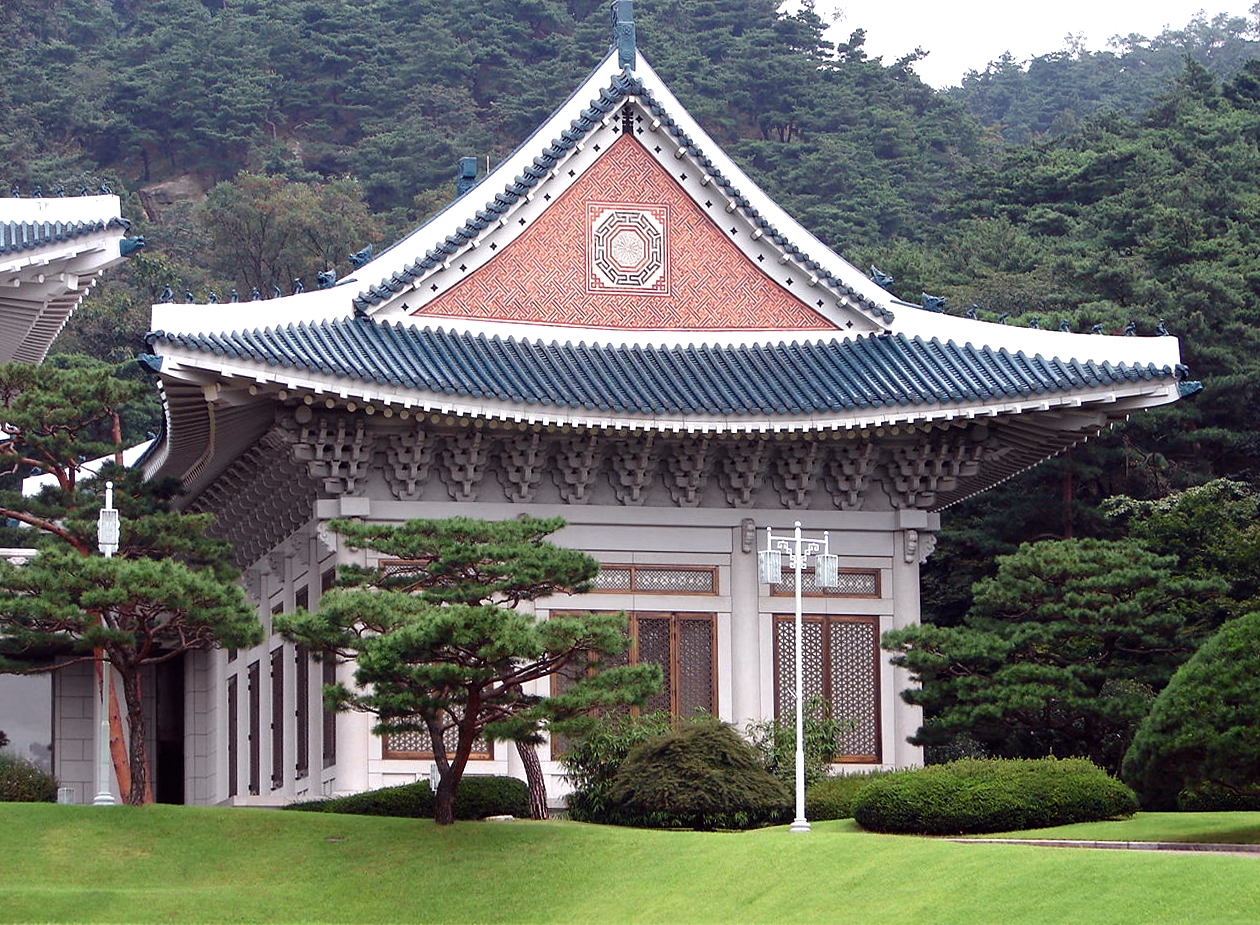
One of the buildings at the Cheong Wa Dae Reception Center

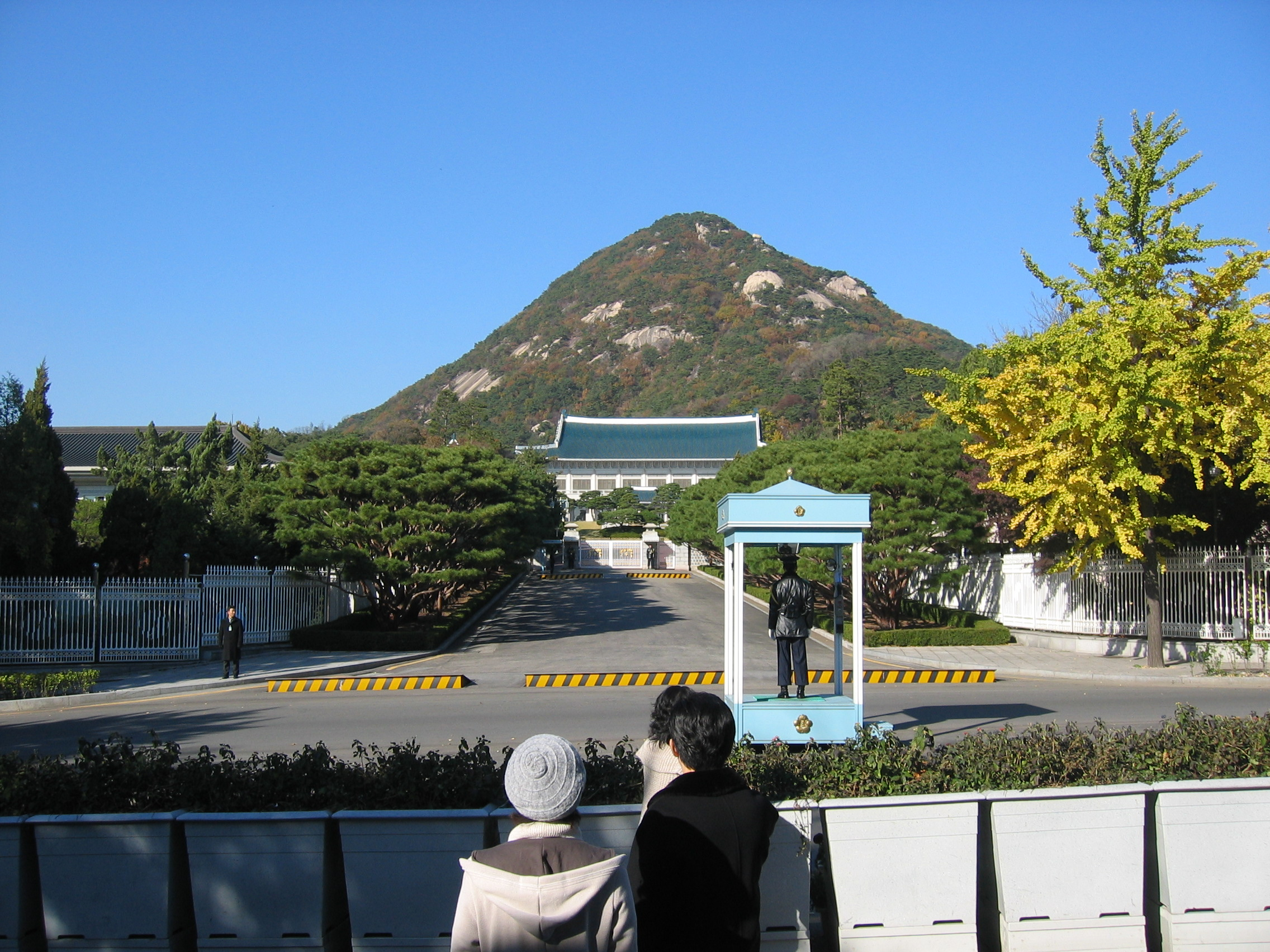
Entrance to Cheong Wa Dae as seen from Gyeongbokgung Palace

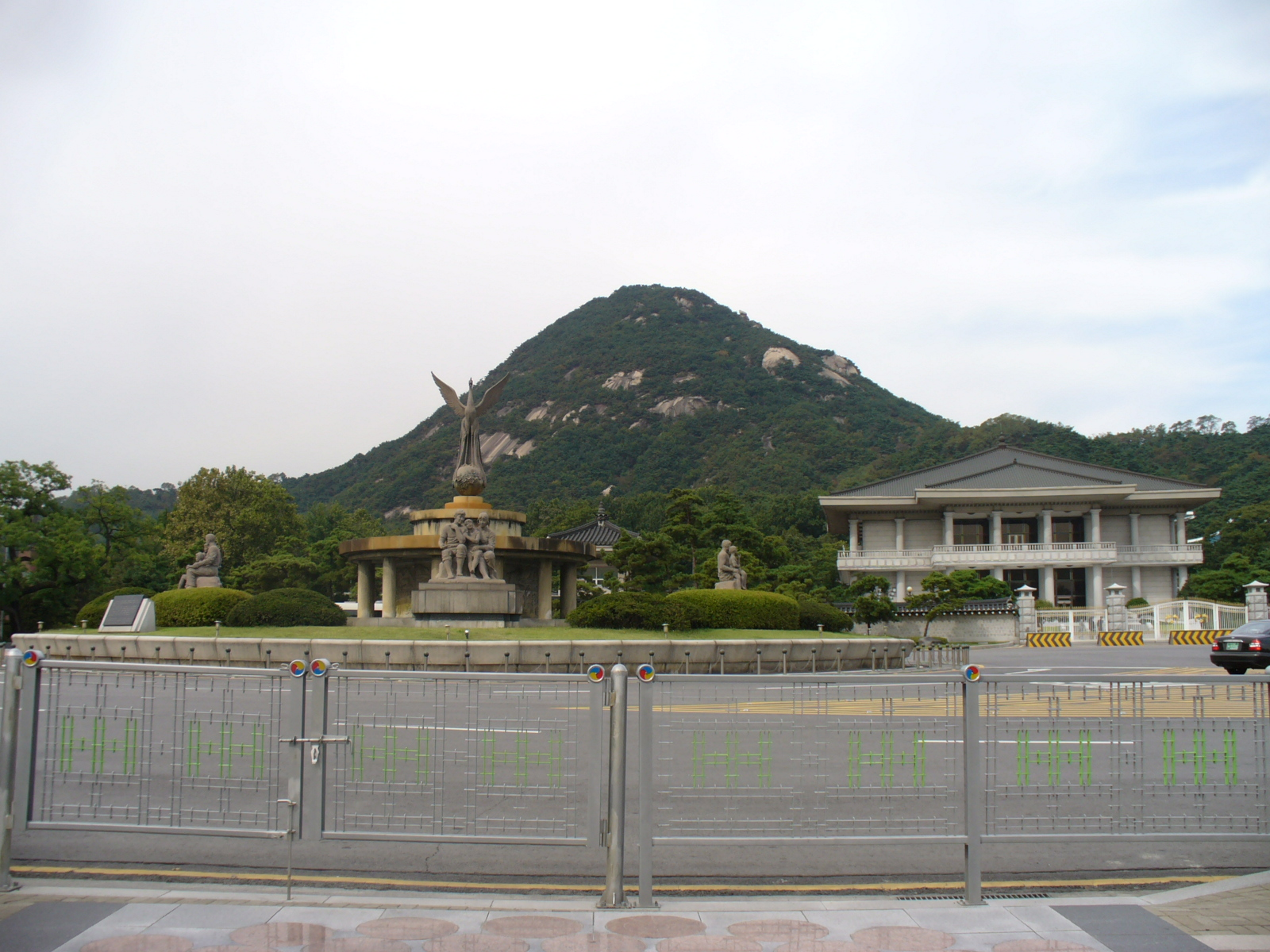
Monument on the road in front of the Cheong Wa Dae, administrative building in the background

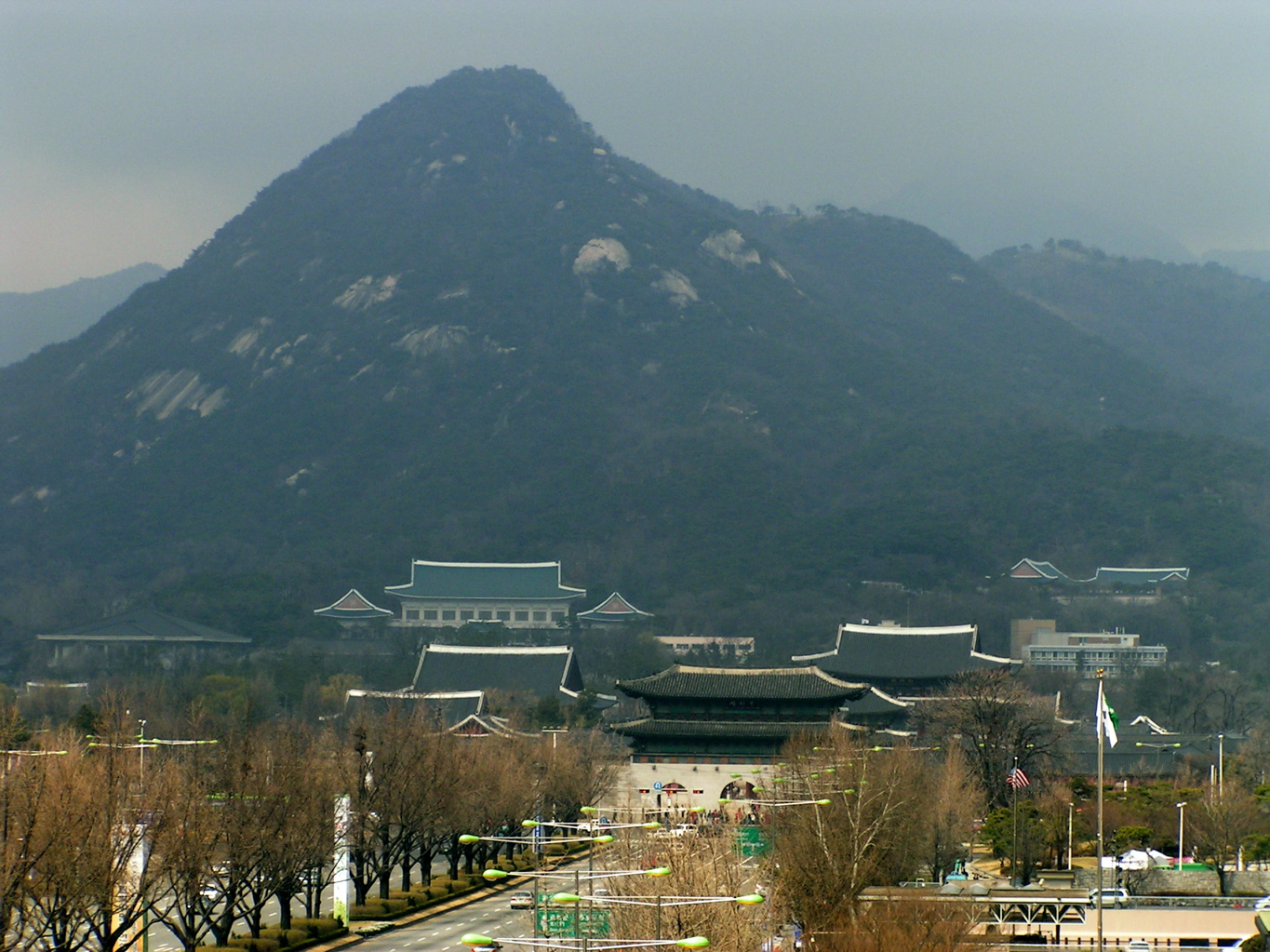
View over the Gyeongbokgung and Cheong Wa Dae at the foot of Bugaksan

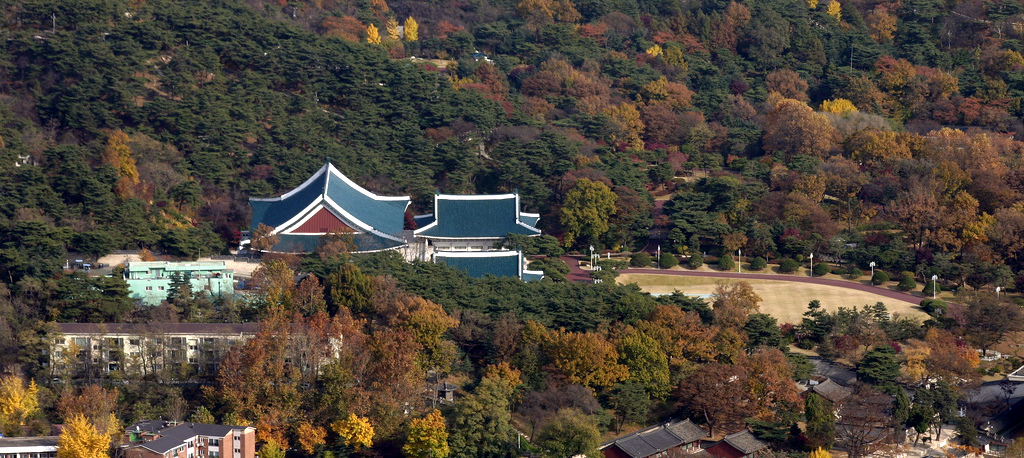
Aerial view of Cheong Wa Dae

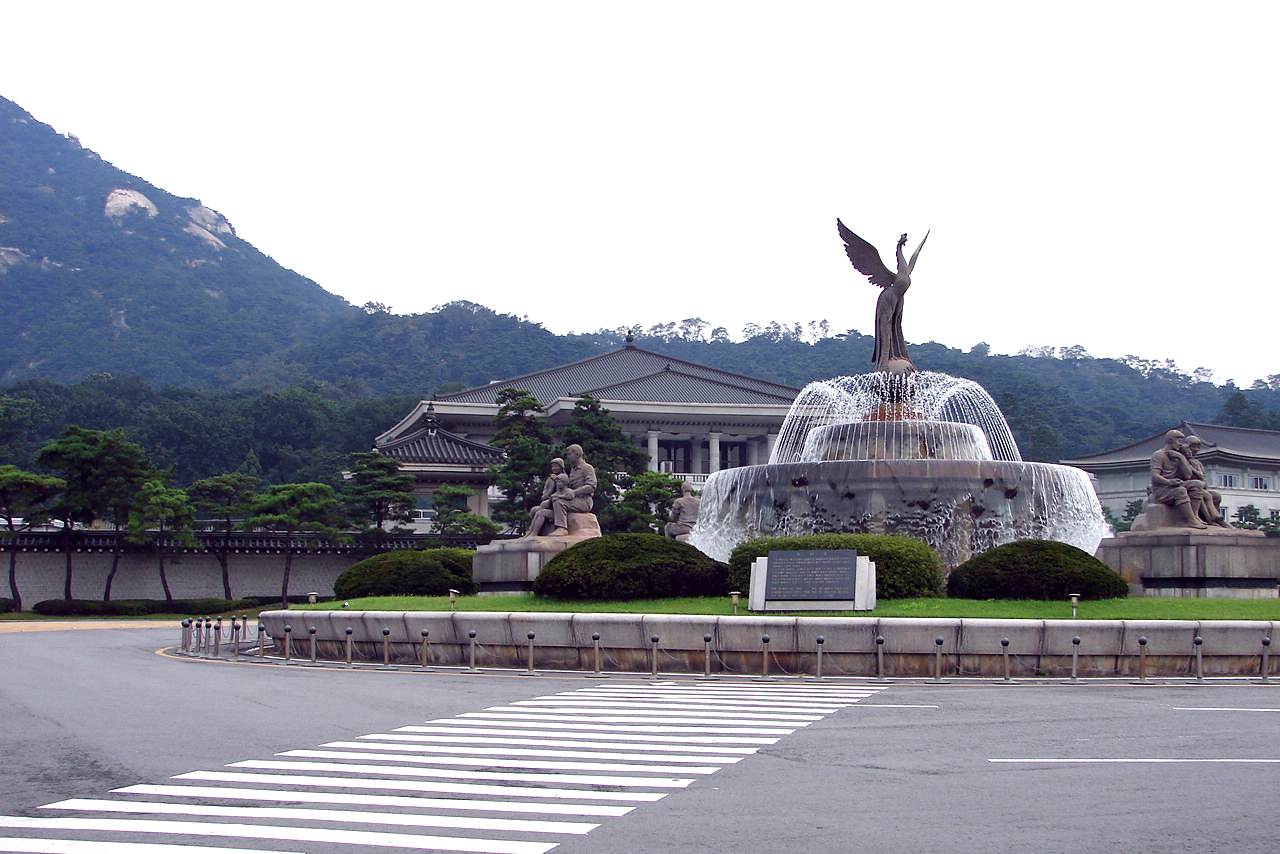
Fountain in front of Cheong Wa Dae

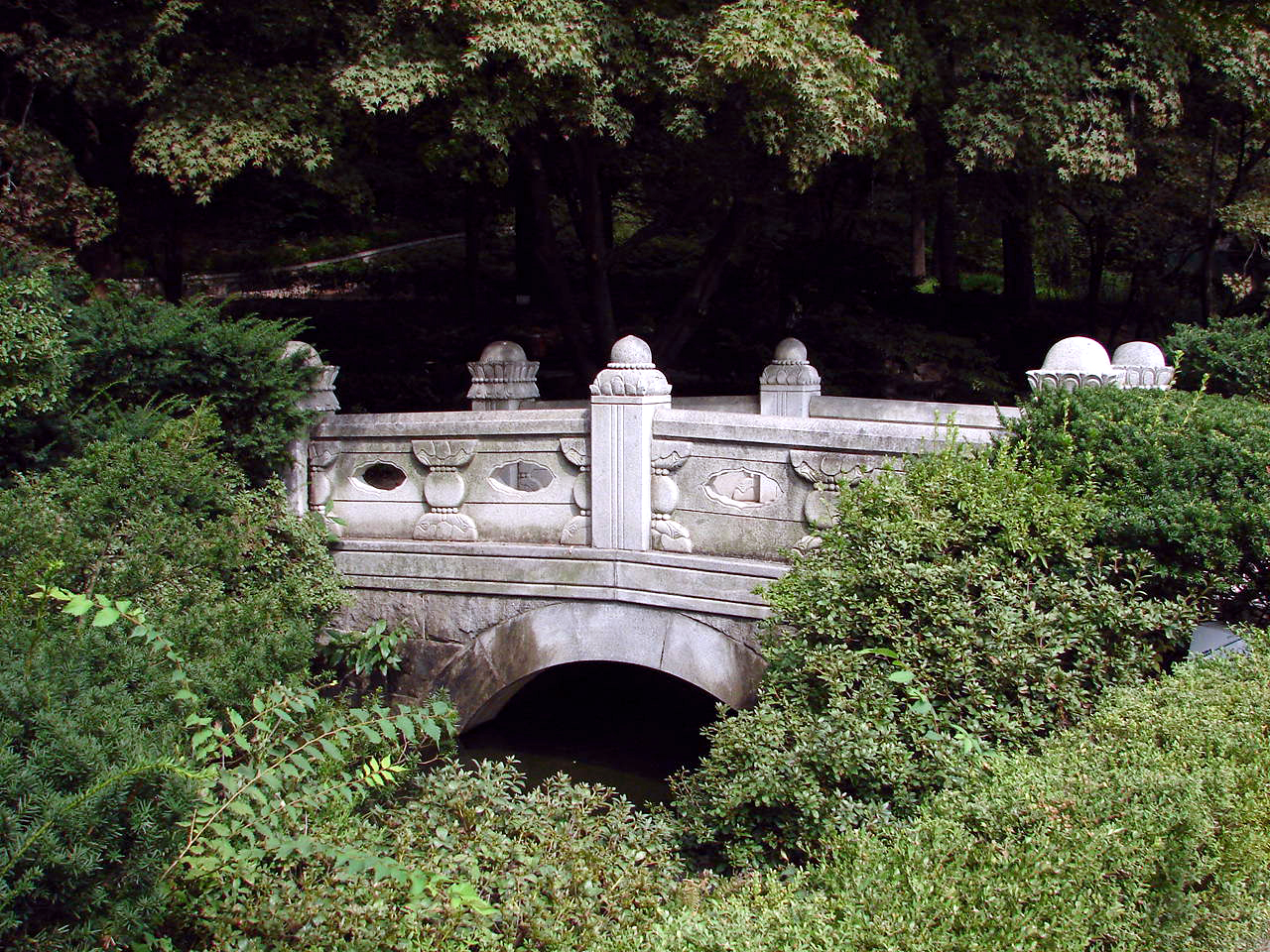
A bridge connecting the garden area to the Reception Center

=== Guards ===
Cheong Wa Dae security is handled by the Presidential Security Service. Three organizations belong to the Seoul Metropolitan Police Agency: the 101st Guards, the 202nd Guards, and the 22nd Police Guard, who are all in charge of the security and protection of Cheong Wa Dae. The 101st Guards protect the interior of Cheong Wa Dae, and the 202nd Guards protect the exterior. The police guards are in charge of guarding the president at events outside Cheong Wa Dae. In the military organization, the first security team belonging to the Capital Security Command is in charge of outer security. There are two battalions, a combat support squadron, an armored squadron, and an air defense unit under its wing. It was established by integrating the 30th and 33rd guards that existed in the past. The number of troops under the wing is about 2,000.

== Feng shui and the media ==
The location of Cheong Wa Dae was traditionally considered a favourable place (Korean: 길지; Hanja: 吉地) according to Korean feng shui, as it is located directly behind the Joseon main palace, Gyeongbokgung. For example, although the exact time of engraving is unknown, Koreans carved 'The Most Blessed Place on Earth' (Korean: 천하제일복; Hanja: 天下第一福地) on a large rock that is now in the backyard of Cheong Wa Dae.

In 1993, Ch'oe Ch'ang-jo, a geographer who studied feng shui, began questioning whether Cheong Wa Dae is actually located in an auspicious place. Ch'oe argued that the location of Cheong Wa Dae is not a place for living humans, but rather a place for spirits and gods. This interpretation's public influence was propelled by a series of misfortunes for former South Korean presidents. His view influenced many South Korean public figures, including former head of the Cultural Heritage Administration Yu Hong-jun, and political broker Myung Tae-kyun. It became one of the reasons for president Yoon Suk-yeol to move his office from Cheong Wa Dae to Yongsan.

However, Yoon's interpretation of Cheong Wa Dae's feng shui has significantly influenced the views of many researchers. Before Yoon opened Cheong Wa Dae to the public, most researchers were unable to visit it in person, as it was the official residence of the president. After its opening, any researchers were able to enter Cheong Wa Dae to study its geography. Direct observation and experience reduced their reliance on figures such as Ch'oe and propelled the revival of traditional interpretations of Cheong Wa Dae as an auspicious place.

After Yoon's downfall in the 2024 South Korean martial law crisis, his views on the negative interpretation of Cheong Wa Dae shifted public sentiment toward the opposite interpretation. This shift in public sentiment was one of the reasons that led President Lee Jae-myung to support a return to Cheong Wa Dae.

Meanwhile, the interpretation of the Cheong Wa Dae's location as inauspicious led Chinese media to coin the neologism 青瓦台詛咒, which can be translated into Korean as 청와대의 저주 'Blue House Curse'. Most Korean newspapers recognized this term as a neologism invented in mainland China, since the Korean concept of 'bad place' (흉지), a standard reviewing flow of powers under feng shui, has no clear relevance to the concept of 'curse' (저주), an active use of witchcraft with menace. As President Yoon was actively using the Yongsan office, his downfall cannot be explained by mythical influence from a malevolent source, such as the bad placement of Cheong Wa Dae. Chinese media continue to characterize Yoon's downfall as a 'curse of the Blue House,' and this unusual expression has become a topic of interest in South Korean media.

On the other hand, according to the analysis of Chinese media, the urban legend that every president of the Republic of Korea (ROK) meets a tragic end is not attributed to geomantic omen (feng shui), but rather to the 'culture of political retribution' inherent in South Korean politics and the excessive powers wielded by the ROK president. The President of South Korea wields significant power with limited checks and balances, a system often dubbed as an 'imperial presidency,' which renders it prone to abuse of power and corruption. The single-term presidency frequently results in a lame-duck government, where, as the president's influence wanes, investigative and prosecutorial agencies can more readily gather evidence to initiate charges against the president. This dynamic contributes to the emergence of the so-called 'Blue House Curse.

== See also ==
- Korean architecture
- History of South Korea
- History of Korea
- Office of the President of the Republic of Korea
  - Presidential Residence of South Korea
- National Assembly Proceeding Hall
- Residences of North Korean leaders - the northern equivalent in the Democratic People's Republic of Korea
