= Yaozhou =

Yaozhou may refer to:

- Yaozhou District, in Tongchuan, Shaanxi, China
- Yaozhou ware, pottery made there
