= Tongchuan =

Tongchuan 铜川市 Tungchwan
- Prefecture-level city
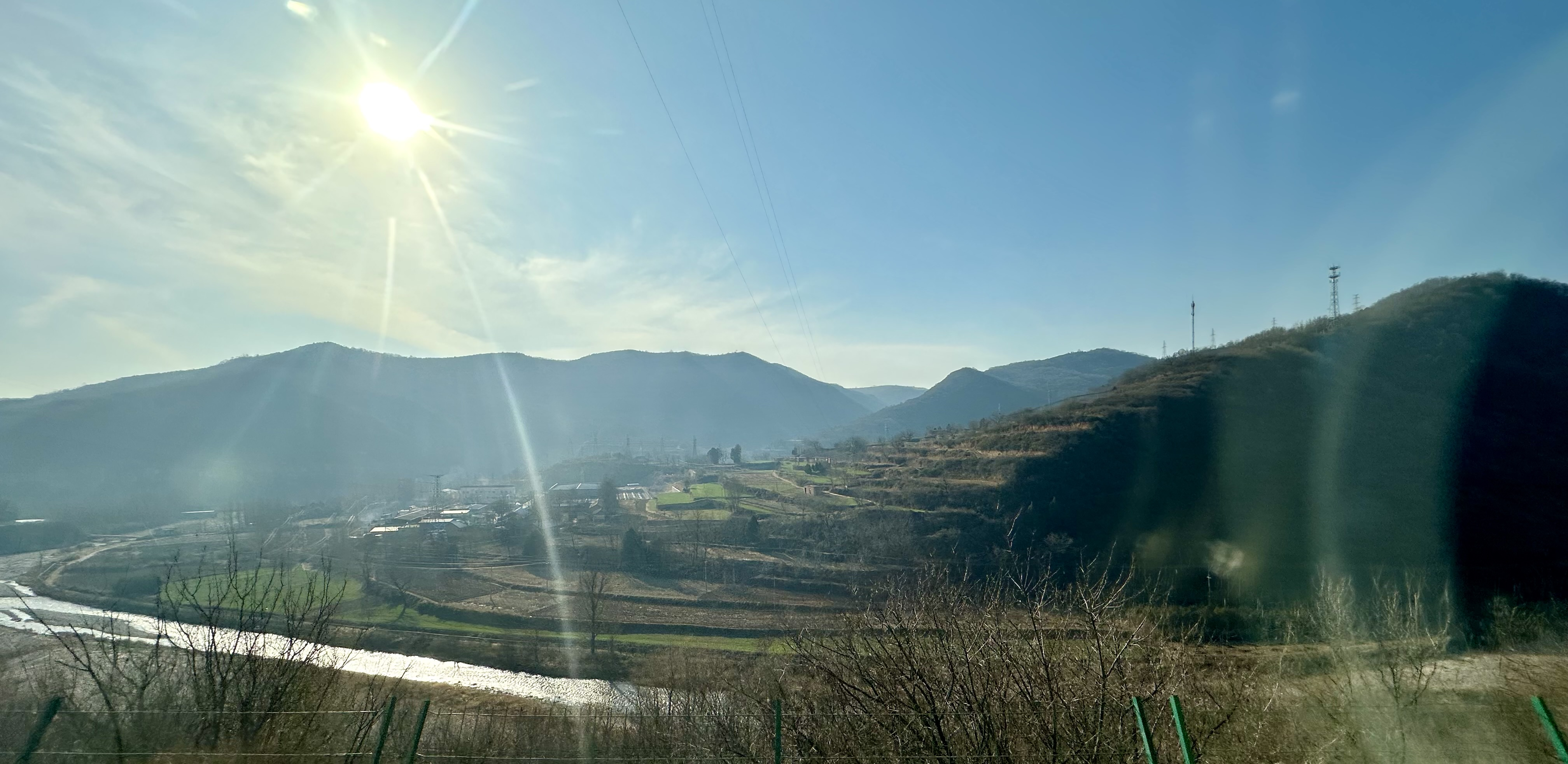

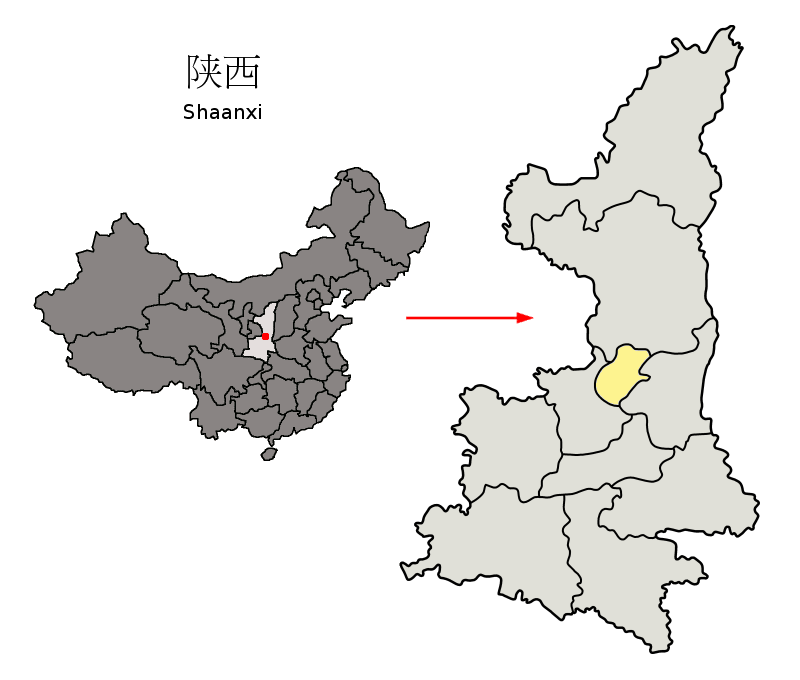
- Location of Tongchuan Prefecture within Shaanxi
- Coordinates (Tongchuan municipal government): 34°53′49″N 108°56′42″E
- Country: People's Republic of China
- Province: Shaanxi
- Municipal seat: Yaozhou District

Area
  - Total: 3,882 km^{2} (1,499 sq mi)

Population (2010)
  - Total: 834,437
  - Density: 215.0/km^{2} (556.7/sq mi)

GDP
  - Total: CN¥ 30.7 billion US$ 4.9 billion
  - Per capita: CN¥ 36,322; US$ 5,832
- Time zone: UTC+8 (China Standard)
- ISO 3166 code: CN-SN-02
- Website: tongchuan.gov.cn

Tongchuan (simplified Chinese: 铜川; traditional Chinese: 銅川; pinyin: Tóngchuān; lit. 'copper river') is a prefecture-level city located in central Shaanxi province, People's Republic of China on the southern fringe of the Loess Plateau that defines the northern half of the province (Shanbei) and the northern reaches of the Guanzhong Plain.

== Economy ==
Tongchuan’s main industries are coal, building materials, machinery, textile and chemical and aluminium industry. Pottery and porcelain, with Yaozhou Kiln products are particularly well known. Tongchuan also produces medicines and food products.

Farm products include apples, hot peppers, Chinese prickly ash, garlic, flue-cured tobacco, walnuts and precious Chinese medicine herbs. Apple wine, apple vinegar, apple soft drink which are made of apples and processing products of hot pepper, walnut etc. are well known in China and are exported to Southeast Asia.

== Climate ==
Climate data for Tongchuan, elevation 979 m (3,212 ft), (1991–2020 normals, extremes 1966–present)
Month	Jan	Feb	Mar	Apr	May	Jun	Jul	Aug	Sep	Oct	Nov	Dec	Year
Record high °C (°F)	16.4 (61.5)	19.9 (67.8)	28.7 (83.7)	34.3 (93.7)	34.7 (94.5)	37.7 (99.9)	37.9 (100.2)	36.5 (97.7)	36.3 (97.3)	29.4 (84.9)	22.3 (72.1)	20.1 (68.2)	37.9 (100.2)
Mean daily maximum °C (°F)	3.3 (37.9)	7.1 (44.8)	12.9 (55.2)	19.4 (66.9)	24.0 (75.2)	28.3 (82.9)	29.2 (84.6)	27.4 (81.3)	22.6 (72.7)	17.0 (62.6)	10.6 (51.1)	4.9 (40.8)	17.2 (63.0)
Daily mean °C (°F)	−2.8 (27.0)	0.9 (33.6)	6.4 (43.5)	12.6 (54.7)	17.3 (63.1)	21.7 (71.1)	23.5 (74.3)	22.0 (71.6)	17.1 (62.8)	11.1 (52.0)	4.6 (40.3)	−1.2 (29.8)	11.1 (52.0)
Mean daily minimum °C (°F)	−6.8 (19.8)	−3.4 (25.9)	1.6 (34.9)	7.0 (44.6)	11.4 (52.5)	15.8 (60.4)	18.7 (65.7)	17.8 (64.0)	13.1 (55.6)	7.0 (44.6)	0.5 (32.9)	−5.2 (22.6)	6.5 (43.6)
Record low °C (°F)	−17.5 (0.5)	−13.7 (7.3)	−11.9 (10.6)	−3.6 (25.5)	0.0 (32.0)	7.3 (45.1)	11.7 (53.1)	10.0 (50.0)	3.7 (38.7)	−6.1 (21.0)	−13.9 (7.0)	−21.8 (−7.2)	−21.8 (−7.2)
Average precipitation mm (inches)	6.8 (0.27)	9.7 (0.38)	18.0 (0.71)	35.0 (1.38)	50.2 (1.98)	73.3 (2.89)	115.1 (4.53)	103.3 (4.07)	92.5 (3.64)	48.3 (1.90)	18.4 (0.72)	5.0 (0.20)	575.6 (22.67)
Average precipitation days (≥ 0.1 mm)	4.0	4.4	5.7	7.6	9.1	9.4	12.3	11.1	11.5	9.4	5.4	3.3	93.2
Average snowy days	5.6	5.2	2.9	0.2	0	0	0	0	0	0.1	2.3	4.2	20.5
Average relative humidity (%)	57	57	56	58	60	62	74	78	78	75	67	58	65
Mean monthly sunshine hours	182.5	163.7	196.8	220.2	237.9	229.9	213.2	205.1	164.9	170.3	171.7	185.7	2,341.9
Percentage possible sunshine	58	53	53	56	55	53	49	50	45	49	56	61	53
Source: China Meteorological Administration all-time extreme temperature

== Administrative divisions ==
Tongchuan city currently comprises 3 administrative county-level subdivisions including 3 district and 1 county.

Map
Name	Hanzi	Hanyu Pinyin	Population (2010)	Area (km^{2})	Density (/km^{2})	Post code
Wangyi District	王益区	Wángyì Qū	200,230	162	1,236	727000
Yintai District	印台区	Yìntái Qū	217,509	627	347	727000
Yaozhou District	耀州区	Yàozhōu Qū	251,860	1,572	160	727100
Yijun County	宜君县	Yíjūn Xiàn	91,160	1,476	64	727200

== Transportation ==
- China National Highway 210

== Tourism ==
There are the ruins of the Yaozhou Kiln, the remains of Yuhua Palace, and many rare historical relics. The Forest of Stone Sculptures on Yaowang Mountain is a major historical relic under state protection.
