= Zhuo Zhenxi =

Chinese archaeologist

Zhuo Zhenxi (Chinese: 禚振西; born 1938) is a Chinese archaeologist known for extensively researching ancient Chinese ceramics, particularly those from the Yaozhou kilns. She has significantly contributed to understanding high-fired ceramic wares in China, combining fieldwork, scientific analysis, and conservation. Zhuo has influenced archaeological scholarship and mentorship, especially in advancing women's roles in Chinese archaeology.

== Early life and education ==
Zhuo was born in 1938 and graduated from the Department of History at Northwest University in 1961. She was among the early cohorts of archaeology graduates from the university. After graduation, she was assigned to the Shaanxi Provincial Institute of Archaeology, where she worked until her retirement in 1998. During the Cultural Revolution, she was sent to the countryside for "social education activities" but resumed her archaeological work afterward.

== Career ==
In 1973, during the late period of the Cultural Revolution, Zhuo was appointed to lead excavations at the Yaozhou kiln site in Huangbaozhen, Shaanxi Province. The Yaozhou kilns were significant centers for producing high-quality stoneware during the Tang and Song dynasties (7th–13th centuries CE), known for their celadon wares and three-color sancai ceramics. Zhuo systematically researched high-fired ceramic wares throughout her career, integrating decades of fieldwork with scientific analyses and conservation practices. She was among the first archaeologists in China to combine these multidisciplinary approaches, which separate specialists typically carried out.

From 2002 onwards, Zhuo led extensive archaeological excavations at kiln sites such as Shangdian, Chenlu, and Lidipo in Tongchuan. These excavations unearthed over 200,000 ceramic specimens and contributed significantly to understanding the history and development of ceramic production in the region from the late Jin to the early modern periods. The findings included more than 3,000 artifacts that could be restored, shedding light on the evolution of porcelain firing techniques and kiln structures.

Even after retirement, Zhuo continued her research and served as the honorary curator and researcher at the Yaozhou Kiln Museum. She remains actively involved in various committees related to ceramic arts and archaeology, including serving as a standing director and academic committee member of the Chinese Ancient Ceramics Society.

=== Contributions and research ===
Zhuo's work has been instrumental in understanding ceramic production's technological development and organizational aspects at the Yaozhou kilns. She is highly regarded for her expertise in distinguishing wares from different kilns and periods.

One of her notable contributions is her hypothesis regarding identifying the Chai kiln, one of the "Five Great Kilns" of ancient China, with the Yaozhou kilns. Based on archaeological findings and historical records, she proposed that the celadon wares produced at the Yaozhou kilns during the Five Dynasties period (907–960 CE) were likely products of the legendary Chai kiln.

=== Mentorship and influence ===
Zhuo has been a nurturing mentor to many students and colleagues, particularly women in archaeology. Known for her good nature and dedication, she invested considerable effort in teaching and training the next generation of archaeologists. Even after retirement, she guided young archaeologists and remained active in academic circles.

== Awards and honors ==
Zhuo has received numerous awards for her contributions to archaeology and ceramic studies in China and internationally. Her work has been recognized for its significance in uncovering and preserving China's cultural heritage.

== Personal life ==
Zhuo was married to fellow archaeologist Du Baoren. Together, they balanced their professional careers with family life by alternating childcare and fieldwork responsibilities until their children were old enough for both parents to participate in fieldwork simultaneously. Her husband died due to illness caused by overwork, and Zhuo continued to honor his legacy through her ongoing research.

== Legacy ==
Zhuo's lifelong dedication to studying Chinese ceramics has greatly enhanced their understanding of ancient Chinese kiln sites and ceramic production. Her efforts have contributed to academic knowledge and played a crucial role in cultural heritage preservation and education.
