= Yue ware =

Type of Chinese ceramics

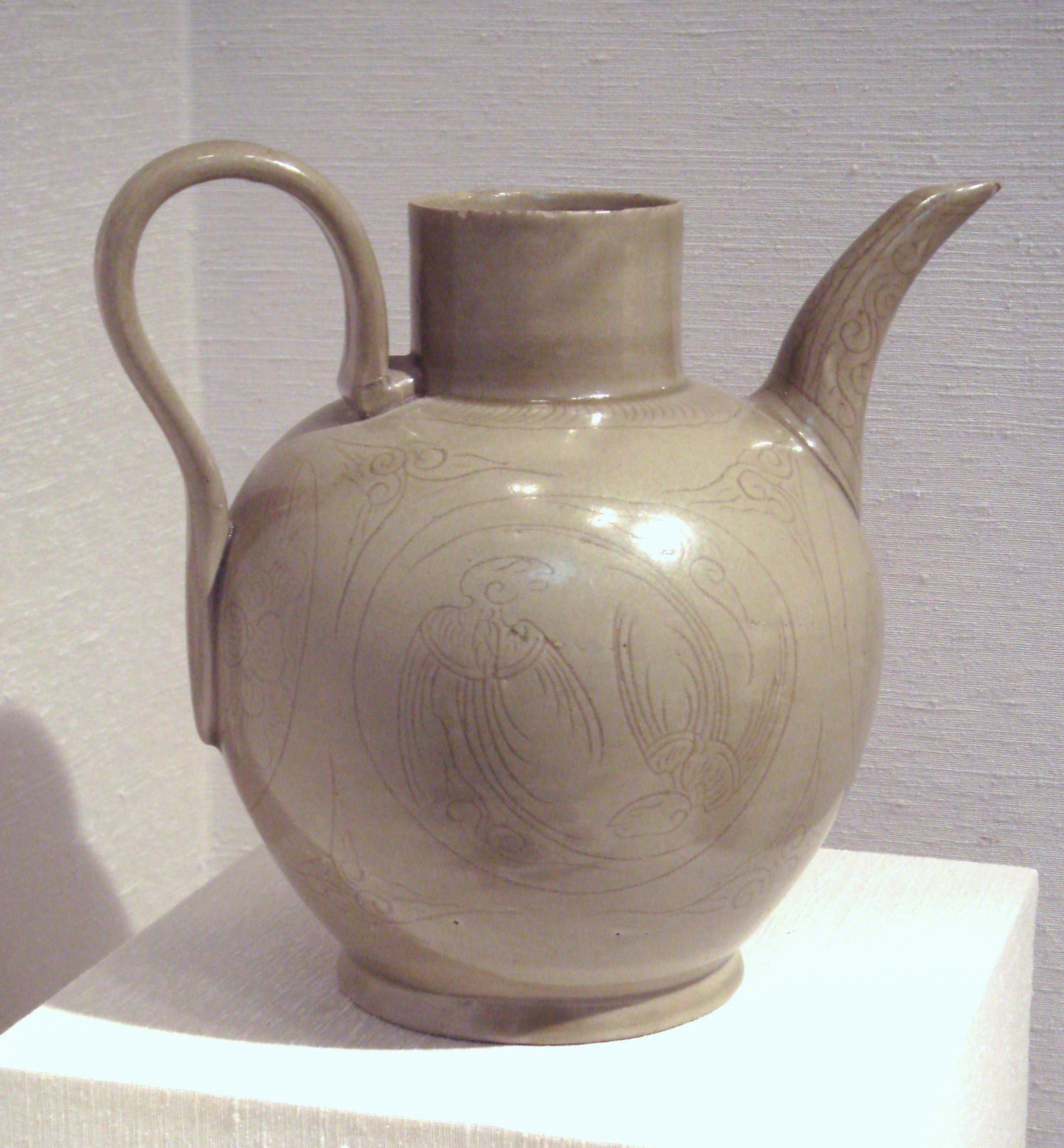
- Yue ware celadon ewer, Five Dynasties period (10th century). Metropolitan Museum of Art.
- Branch: Chinese ceramics
- Years active: Eastern Han – Northern Song dynasty (2nd–12th century); peak during Tang and Five Dynasties
- Location: Shaoxing, Shangyu, Yuyao, and Cixi, Zhejiang, China (ancient Yuezhou)
- Influences: Early proto-celadon tradition
- Influenced: Ru ware, Yaozhou ware, Longquan ware, Goryeo celadon

Yue ware or Yüeh ware (Chinese: 越(州)窯; pinyin: Yuè(zhōu) yáo; Wade–Giles: Yüeh(-chou) yao) is a type of Chinese ceramics, a felspathic siliceous stoneware, which is characteristically decorated with celadon glazing. Yue ware is also sometimes called (Yuezhou) green porcelain ((越州)青瓷; (Yuèzhōu) qīngcí) in modern literature, but the term is misleading as it is not really porcelain (on Western definitions) and its shades are not really green. It has been "one of the most successful and influential of all south Chinese ceramics types".

The wares covered by the term have been gradually reduced; initially used for a wide range of early celadons with a grey body, it was first made more specific to refer only to wares from north China, and then later only to those from the Tang dynasty onwards, and sometimes to restrict it "to the finest quality wares of the ninth and tenth centuries". At the same time it has been realized that very similar wares were made at a number of northern kilns, and today the term Yue-type is often preferred.

As the first fine glazed Chinese wares with no toxicity problems from the glazing, Yue ware begins the classic tradition of Chinese ceramics used for serving food and drinking wine or tea. Typically thin-bodied and finely made, with subtle glaze effects and very elegant shapes, Yue ware set the taste for monochrome pieces, sometimes with restrained incised decoration, that lasted for several centuries after.

Closed shapes such as vases, ewers, and ritual objects could have sculptured parts.

== Technique ==
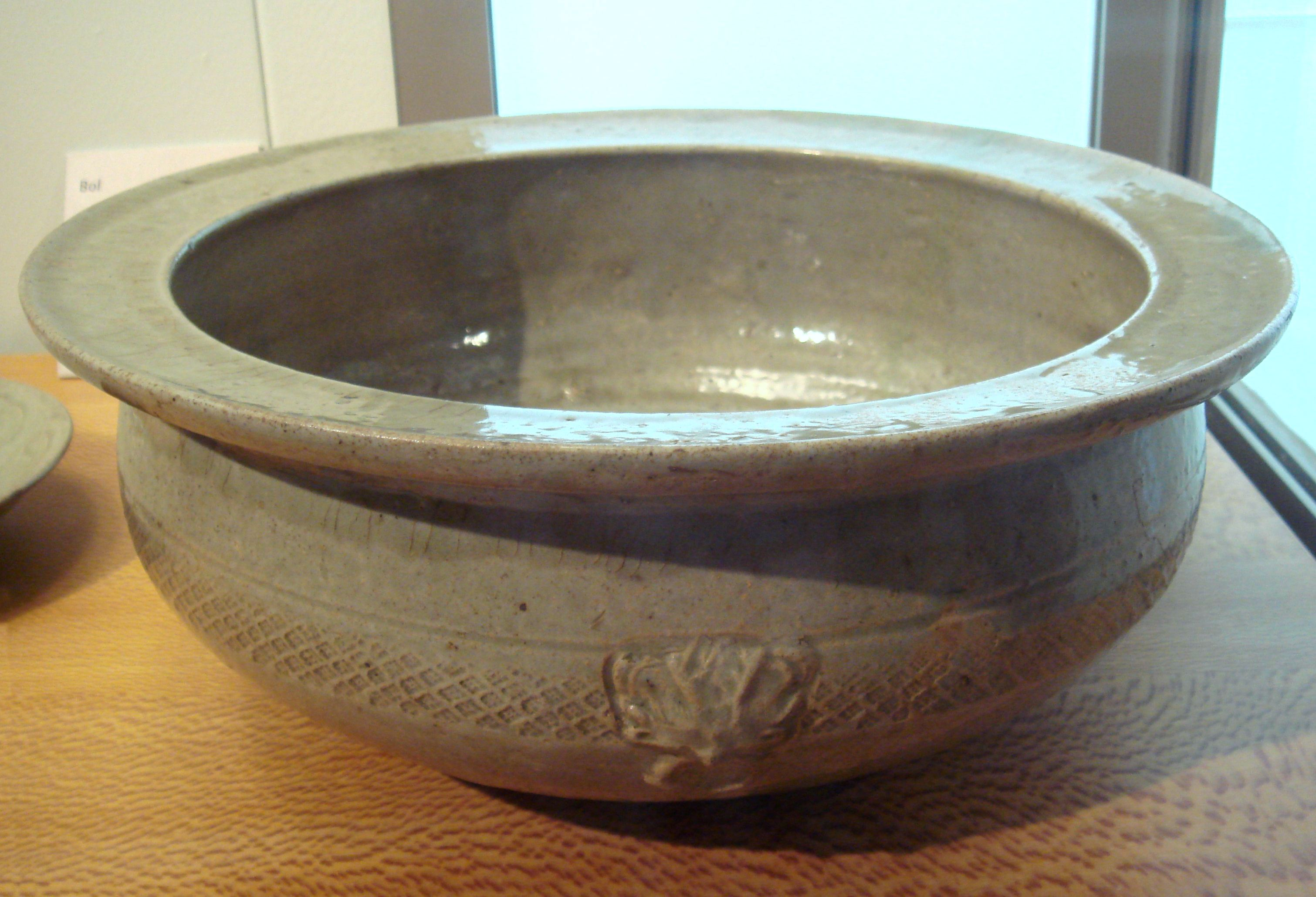
Yue ware with motif, 3rd century CE, Western Jin, Zhejiang

Yue ware was fired in dragon kilns. The Yue glazing was an ash glaze, made with a recipe using wood ash and clay, and possibly small amounts of limestone. Firing temperature is thought to have been about 1,000 °C (1,830 °F) or slightly higher. The colour of the glaze ranges from grey to olive to brown. Yue ware is considered as the ancestor of Song celadon ceramics.

== Evolution ==
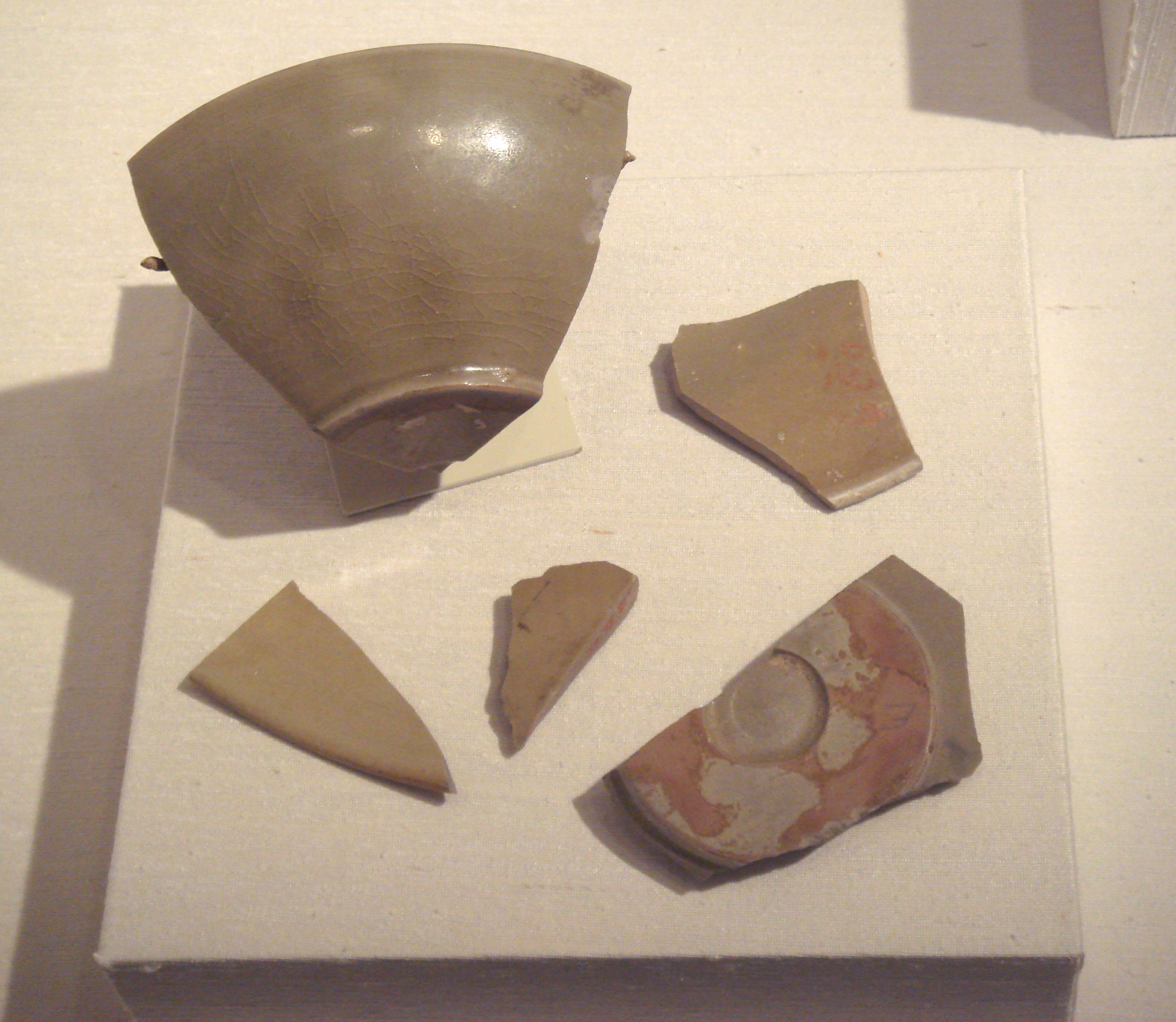
Tang dynasty stoneware with celadon glaze (Yue ware), found in Samarra, Iraq

Yue ware originated in the Yue kilns of Northern Zhejiang, in the site of Jiyuan near Shaoxing, which was called Yuezhou (越州) in ancient times. Its name goes back to the Yue Kingdom of the Spring and Autumn period (770–476 BCE). Yue ware was first manufactured in the 2nd century CE, when it consisted of very precise imitations of bronze vessels, many of which have been found in tombs of the Nanjing region. After this initial phase, Yue ware evolved progressively into true ceramic form, and became a medium of artistic expression. Production in Jiyuan stopped in the 6th century, but expanded to various areas of Zhejiang, especially the Shanglin Lake Yue Kilns near Ningbo.

Yue ware was highly valued and was used as tribute for the imperial court of China in the 9th century. Significantly, it was also used in China's most revered Famen Temple in Shaanxi Province. Yue ware was exported to the Middle East early on. In an early example of Chinese influences on Islamic pottery, shards of Yue ware have been excavated in Samarra, Iraq. From the 8th to the 11th centuries, it was also exported to East Asia, South Asia, and East Africa.

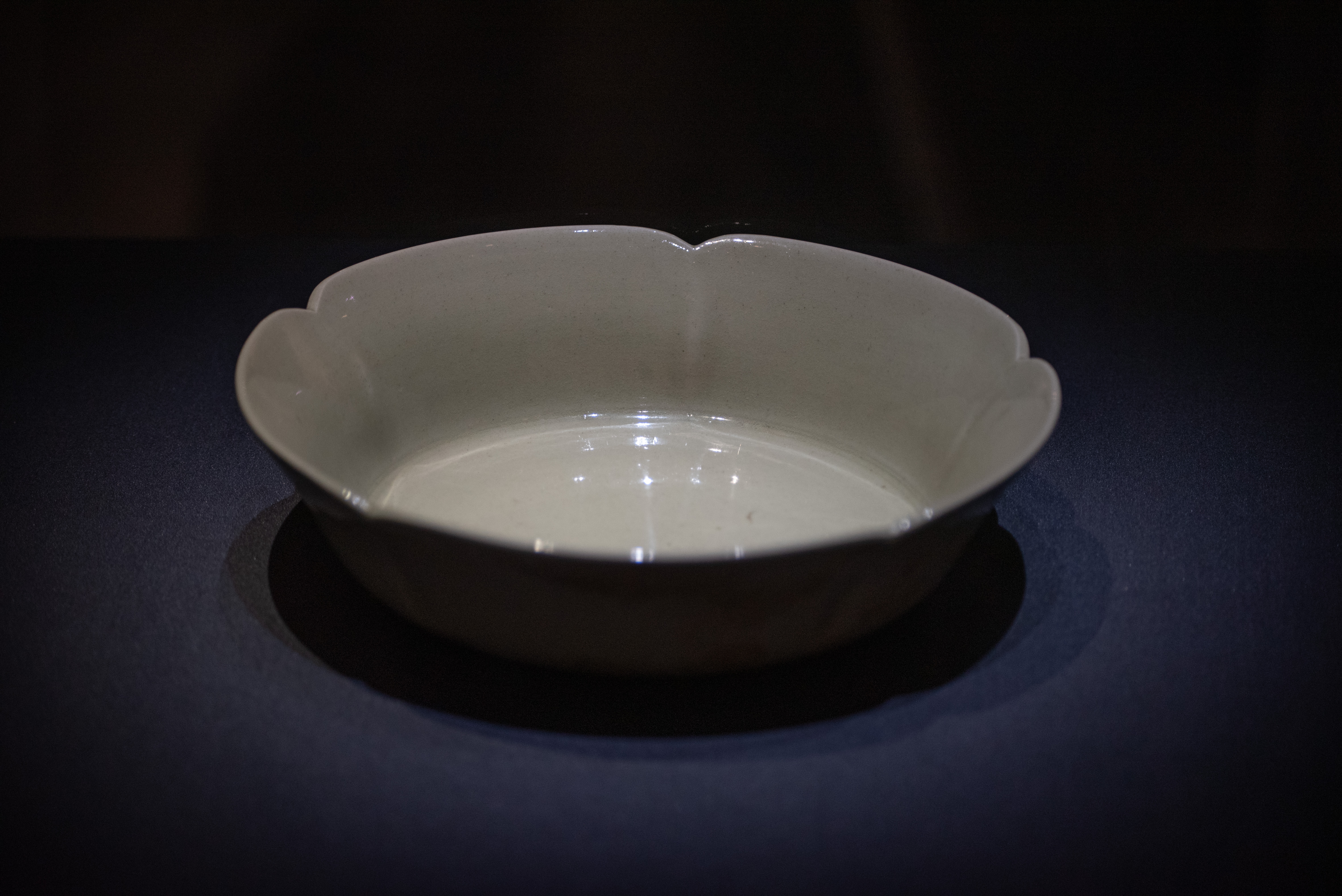
A Mi-se dish from Famen Temple

A particularly refined form of Yue ware is the Mi-se Yue ware (秘色越器, or 秘色青瓷, "Secret color Yue ware") found in the Famen Temple and dated to the 9th century. This ware was undecorated but characterized by a smooth and thin glaze of a light color, either yellowish green or bluish green.

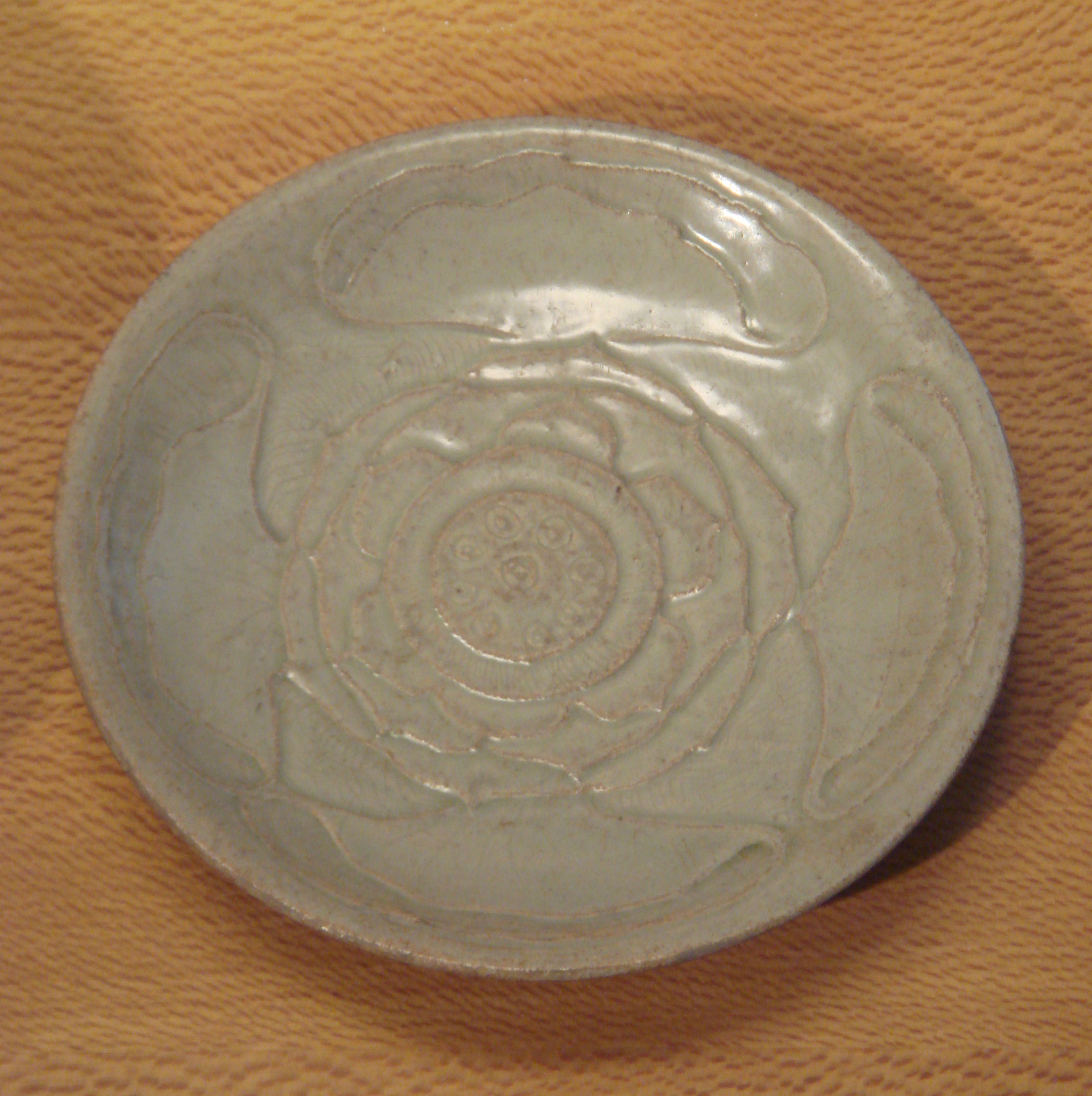
Yue plate, Zhejiang, 10th century

Korean celadons were thought to be influenced by Yue ware by the 9th–10th centuries, and displayed a bluer glaze through the use of low-iron and low-titania lime glazes, closer to the eutectic ideal. However, the Koreans developed their own bluish-green celadon glazes by the Koryo dynasty, that was different from those of Yue wares.
