= Longquan celadon =

Type of green-glazed Chinese ceramic

Coordinates: 28°04′30″N 119°07′15″E

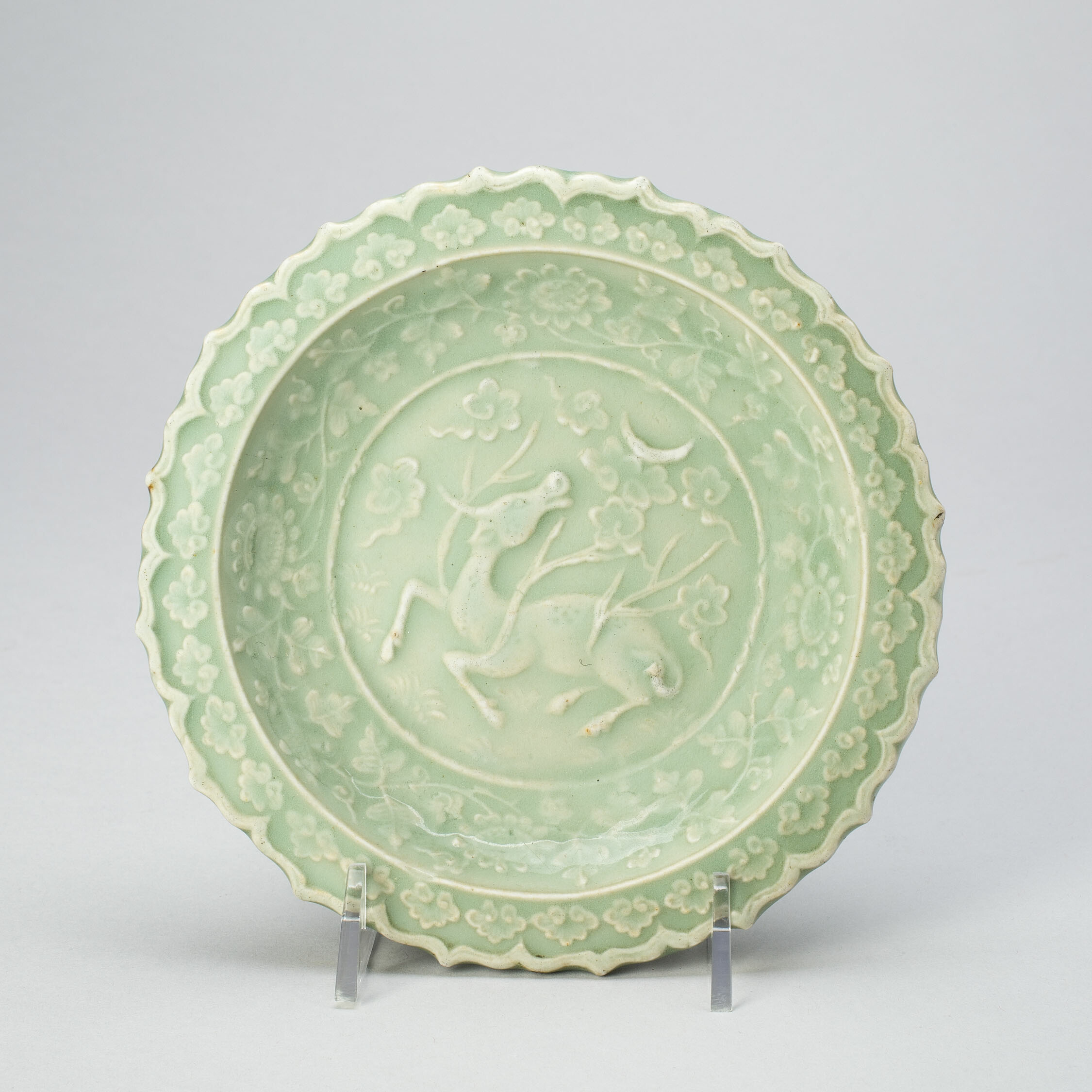
- Longquan celadon dish with foliate rim and bovine (xiniu) gazing at crescent moon motif, Yuan dynasty (late 13th century). Art Institute of Chicago.
- Branch: Chinese ceramics
- Years active: Northern Song – Qing dynasty (10th–18th century); peak during Southern Song and Yuan
- Location: Longquan and surrounding counties, Zhejiang, China
- Influences: Yue ware, Guan ware
- Influenced: Ming–Qing Jingdezhen celadon, Seto ware, Southeast Asian celadon

Longquan celadon
- Traditional Chinese: 龍泉青瓷
- Simplified Chinese: 龙泉青瓷
Transcriptions
Standard Mandarin
- Hanyu Pinyin: lóngquán qīngcí

Traditional firing technology of Longquan celadon
- UNESCO Intangible Cultural Heritage
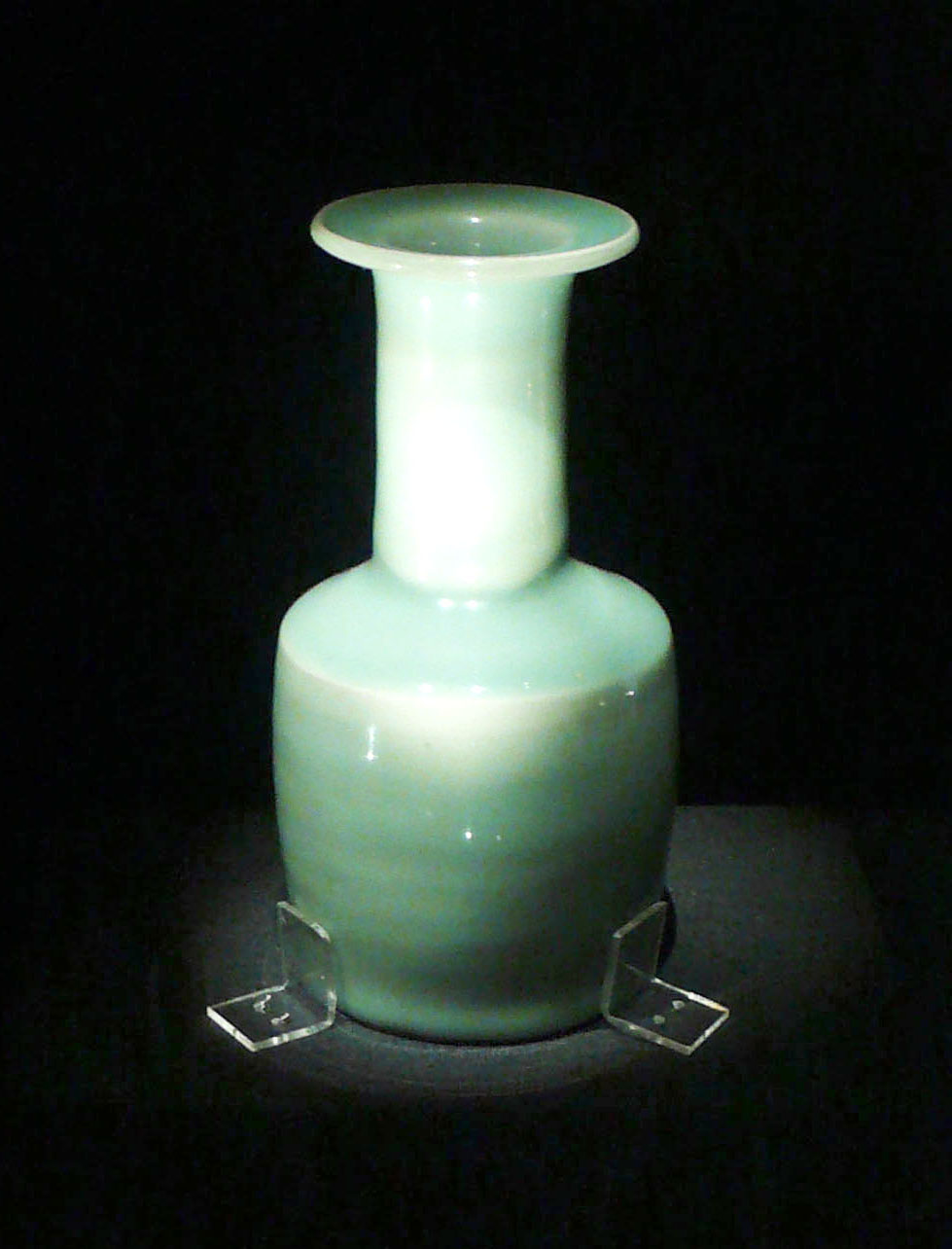
- Country: China
- Reference: 205
- Region: Asia and the Pacific

Inscription history
- Inscription: 2009
- UNESCO Cultural Heritage

Longquan celadon (Chinese: 龙泉青瓷) is a type of green-glazed Chinese ceramic, known in the West as celadon or greenware, produced from about 950 to 1550. The kilns were mostly in Lishui prefecture in southwestern Zhejiang Province in the south of China, and the north of Fujian Province. Overall a total of some 500 kilns have been discovered, making the Longquan celadon production area one of the largest historical ceramic producing areas in China. "Longquan-type" is increasingly preferred as a term, in recognition of this diversity, or simply "southern celadon", as there was also a large number of kilns in north China producing Yaozhou ware or other Northern Celadon wares. These are similar in many respects, but with significant differences to Longquan-type celadon, and their production rose and declined somewhat earlier.

Celadon production had a long history at Longquan and related sites, but it was not until the Northern Song (960–1127) period that large-scale production began, and the move of the capital to Hangzhou, close to Longquan, after the start of the Southern Song (1127–1279), was probably important in the great expansion of both quality and production there. Both continued at high levels in the Yuan (1271–1368) and the early part of the Ming (1368–1644) periods. Longquan celadons were an important part of China's export economy for over five hundred years, and were widely imitated in other countries, especially Korea and Japan. Their demise came after they were overtaken in their markets by blue and white porcelain from Jingdezhen.

Goryeo Korea imitated Longquan celadon in glaze color, preserving its distinct green color. However, influenced by Liao Dynasty's own imitations of Longquan celadon, developed new shapes and patterns which led to the ultimately distinct bisaek celadon, which other countries (China, Japan, etc) considered “celebrated artworks.” The distinctive features of Goryeo's bisaek celadon include the green-gray hue and masterful incising abilities which added patterns to the ceramics’ surface.

In traditional Western terms, most celadons are strictly counted as stoneware, since the fired clay body is usually neither white nor translucent. In the traditional Chinese classification, which divides pottery into low-fired earthenware and high-fired porcelain, they count as porcelain. Compromise terms such as "porcellanous stoneware" may be used to describe the pieces, and some Western writers consider the wares should be "regarded as porcelains".

The Longquan celadons were among the finest of a range of celadon wares produced in China, and led stylistic and technical developments. The celadons were produced in a range of shades of colour, centred on olive-green, but extending to greenish blues (regarded as desirable, but less common) and browns. All these colours come from the glaze; the body beneath is sometimes left partly unglazed as part of the decoration, when it fires to a terracotta brown. The wares are hardly ever painted; decoration comes from the vessel shape and carved or incised designs in the body. Shapes were originally mostly simple, allowing the glaze colour to create the main effect of a piece, but in later periods raised decoration was common.

== Technical aspects and decoration ==
The body of Longquan celadon, as seen in fragments under glaze, varies from "a heavy, compact grey stoneware to an almost white porcellaneous material", but where fired at the surface this turns to a typical terracotta reddish brown, seen at the unglazed foot of many pieces, and when relief decoration is left unglazed (see below and illustration). This distinguishes Longquan from Northern Celadons. However, this may not be the case in pieces made from the most whitish, porcellanous, material, where the fired body may also "be translucent if thin enough". In Western sources, individual pieces are normally classified as stoneware, but some may be called porcelain; material translated from the Chinese is likely to describe all as "porcelain".

The body was normally thrown on the potter's wheel, with large vases often thrown in sections and luted together. Templates were used, and sometimes moulds, including two-part moulds, and moulds including decoration. Unglazed biscuit relief sections were achieved either by sprigging the reliefs over a glazed area before firing, where the surface would be flat in the kiln, or by adding a resist of wax or grease before glazing, when the sides of a vase were decorated.

The glaze colours vary across a wide spectrum of greyish to blueish greens, with some yellowish browns as well. The colour comes from iron oxide fired in a reducing atmosphere, and the colour varies with the temperature and the strength and timing of the reduction. Longquan celadon was fired in long dragon kilns, brick tunnels rising up a slope, with a series of chambers, and the best results came from the pots in the uppermost stages, which heated up more slowly and evenly. Saggars were always used, and the longer kilns, with up to twelve chambers, might have been able to fire as many as 25,000 pieces at a time. The firing temperature was probably between 1,180 °C and 1,280 °C, with the range over 1,250 °C giving the best green or blue colours. In some cases at least there appear to have been layers of glaze and also multiple firings to achieve a deeper glaze effect.

The glaze is made opaque by the presence of plant ash and tiny bubbles of gas, which give a lustrous effect. With the whiter body clays pieces may be translucent. The pronounced reddish colour of unglazed areas comes from the end of the firing, as the heated clay comes in contact with fresh air let into the kiln, and the iron present turns into ferrous oxide. Many pieces have crazing or crackle in the glaze, but much less than in the closely related Guan ware. A technique sometimes found before about 1400 was to add spots or splashes of a mixture rich in iron oxide with an appearance of randomness; these fired a dark brown.

Both Chinese and Japanese tradition have developed a range of terms to describe the glaze colours and qualities; some of the Japanese ones have the advantage of being anchored to specific pieces in Japan. The term kinuta (砧青瓷) meaning "mallet", probably after a particular mallet vase, represents the most admired blue-green colour from the Song period, and is often used in English, while tenryūji has a "a faint yellowish-green tone", and is from the Yuan and Ming. The shickikan type is from the middle Ming, after the glaze became more transparent. As with other celadons, for the Chinese the similarity of the colour to jade, always the most prestigious material in Chinese art, was an important factor in their appeal, and something the potters attempted to increase.

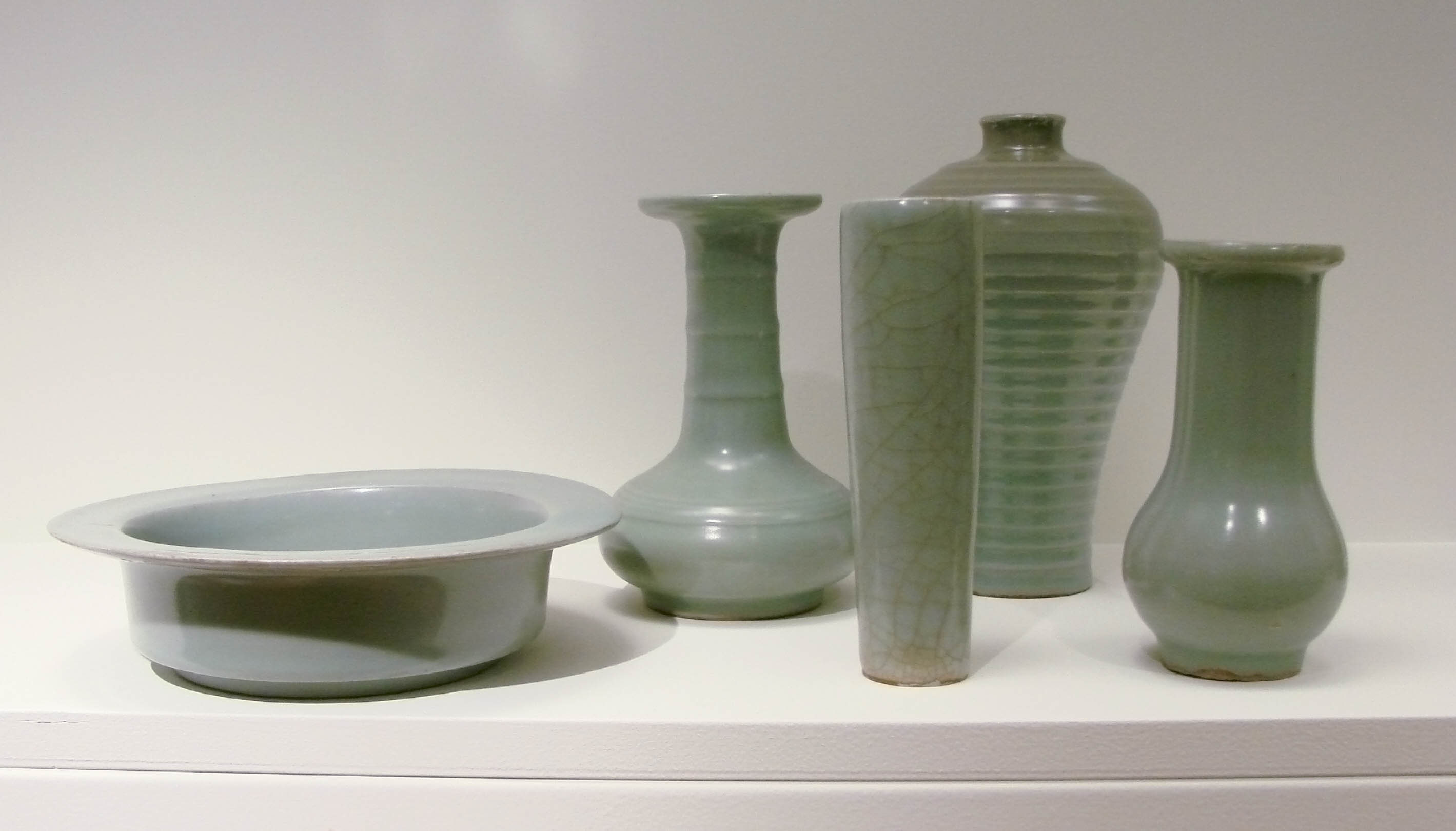
Group of 13th-century vessels

Most shapes are simple but very elegant. The size and decoration of larger fine pieces increases from the Yuan onwards, with some very large vases and lidded wine jars being made by the 14th century. The "mallet" vase was a special favourite at Longquan, often with handles formed as animals or dragons. Funerary vases, made in pairs, also often feature charmingly stylized animals, usually tigers and dragons, curled around the shoulders of the vessel. These were used in southern Chinese burial custom to store provisions for the afterlife. Another distinct Longquan style was a dish with two or more fishes in low relief swimming in the centre, either in biscuit or glazed; these sometimes have holes drilled for metal handles, as mentioned in a late 14th-century source.

In general, Longquan decoration tends to project from the body, and the effects that Northern Celadon gets from glaze pooling over shallow carving into the body are less common. Earlier pieces are content with subtle glaze effects, often accentuated by the glaze thinning over small ridges or ribs, while later pieces have more elaborate floral scrolls or animals in relief. Religious figurines and shrines were rare before the Yuan, and never a large part of production; as in Qingbai, these sometimes mix biscuit, for the flesh or figure, with a glazed background.

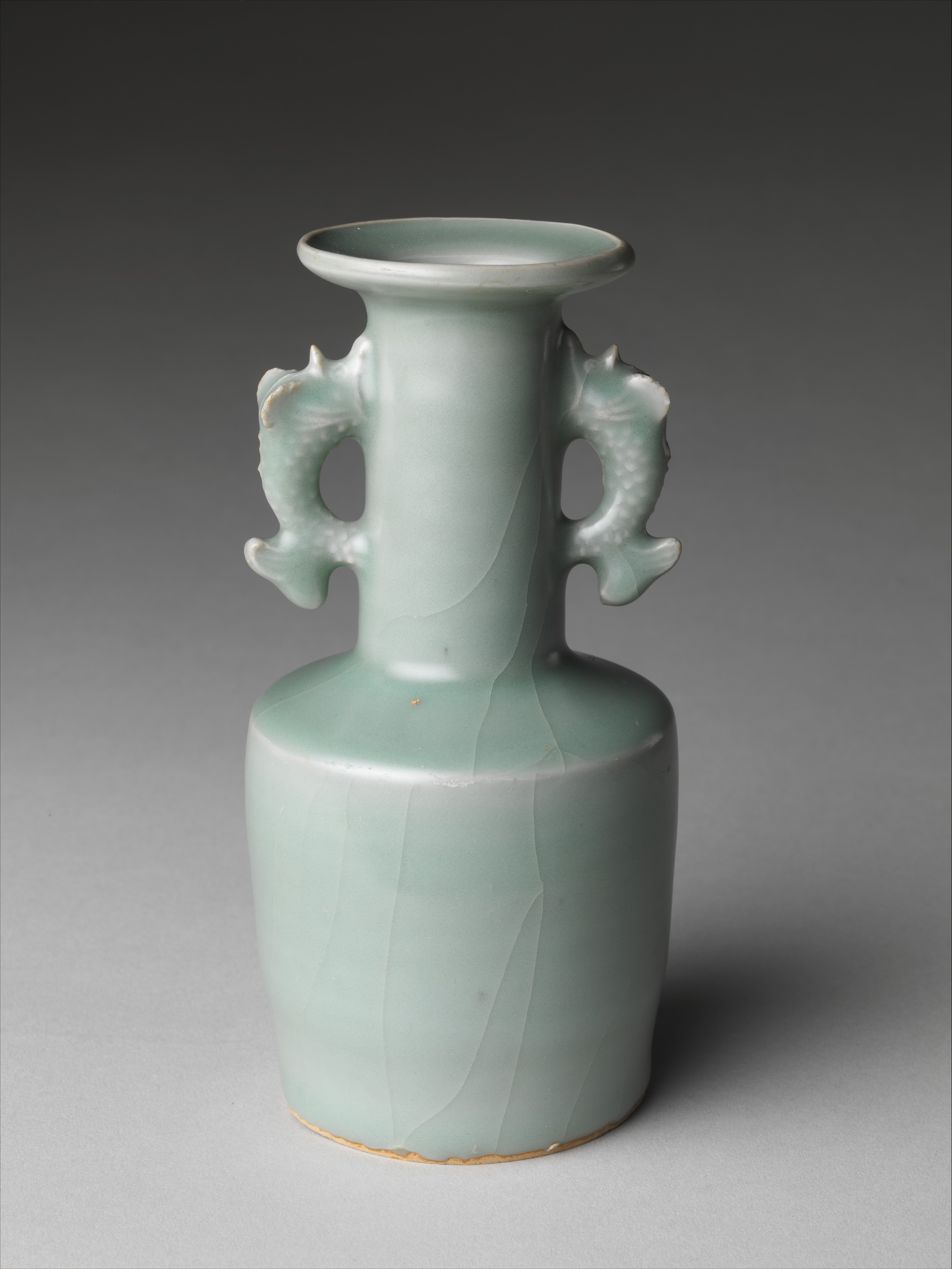
"Mallet" vase with stylized animal handles, Southern Song, 12th century

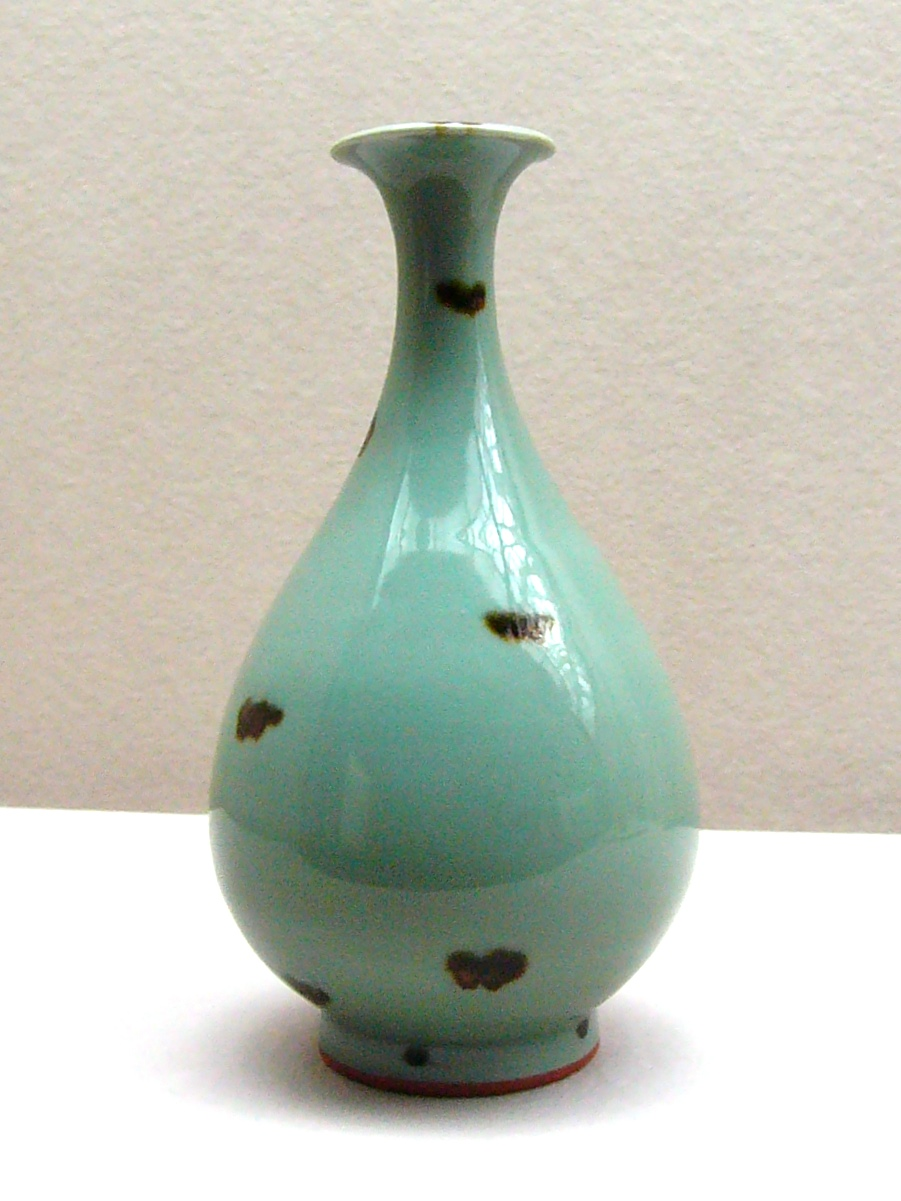
Vase with iron spot decoration, Yuan

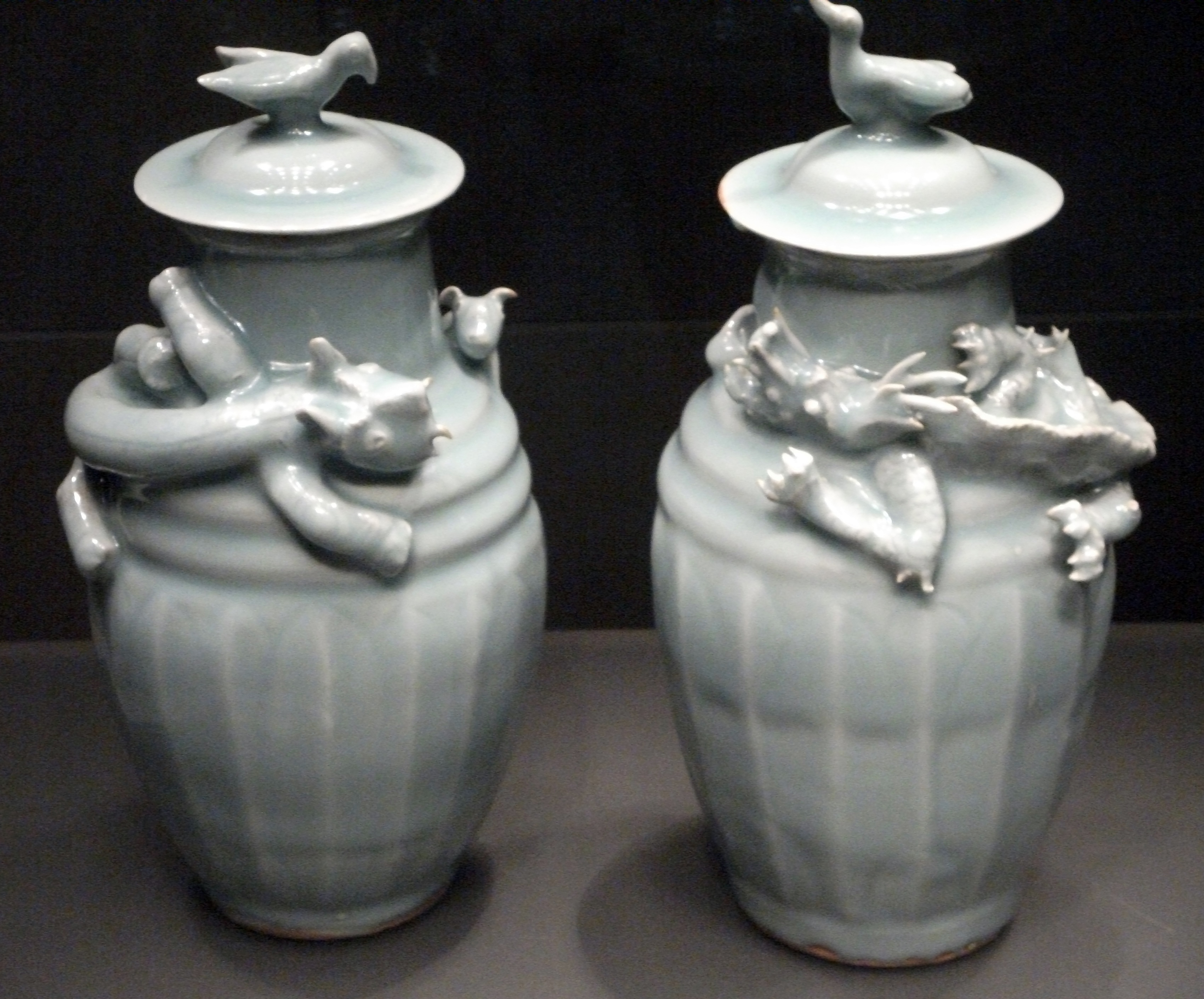
Pair of funerary lidded vases with animals; left, tiger chasing a dog, right, dragon chasing a pearl, Southern Song

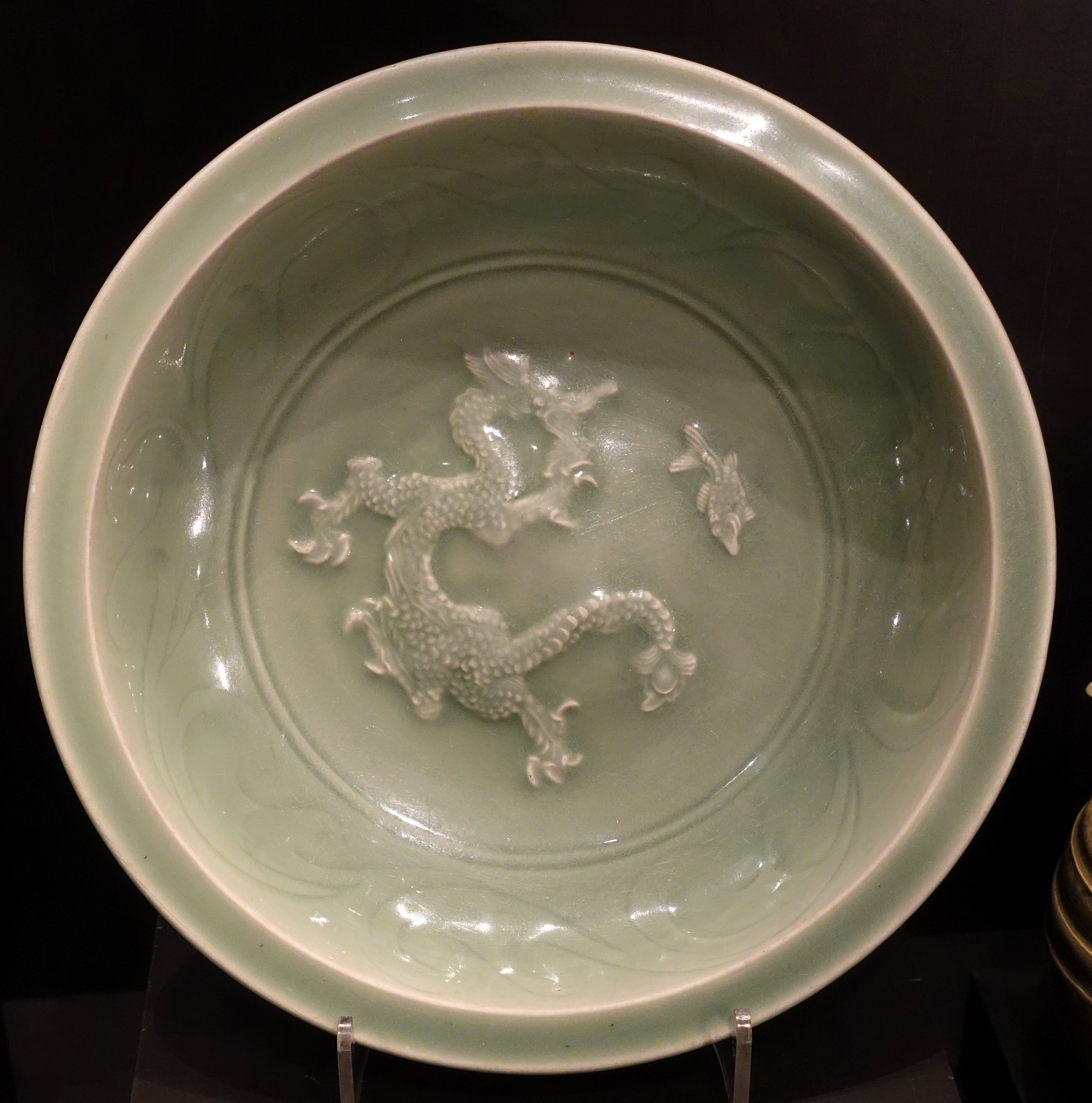
Dish with a dragon in the center

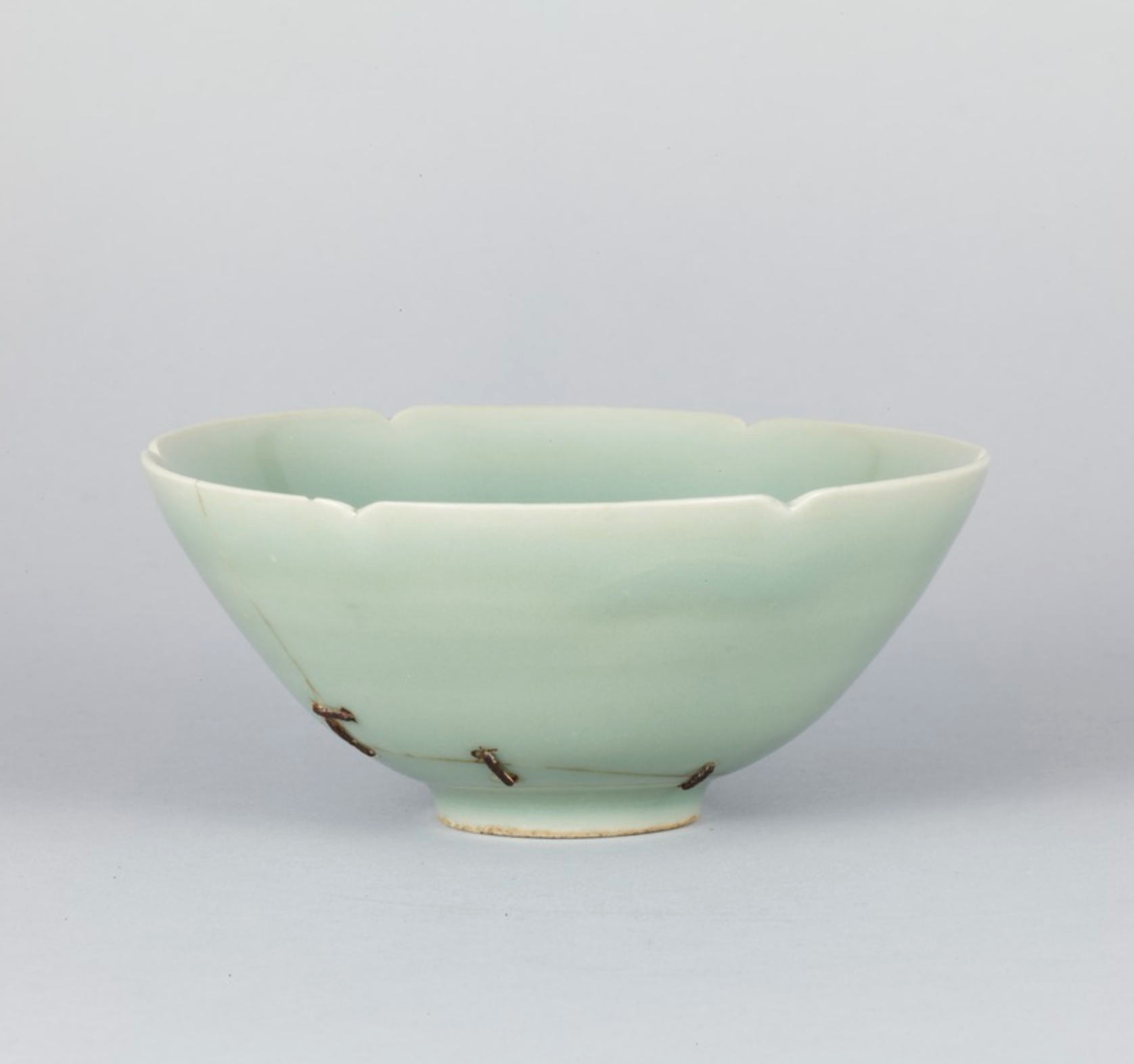

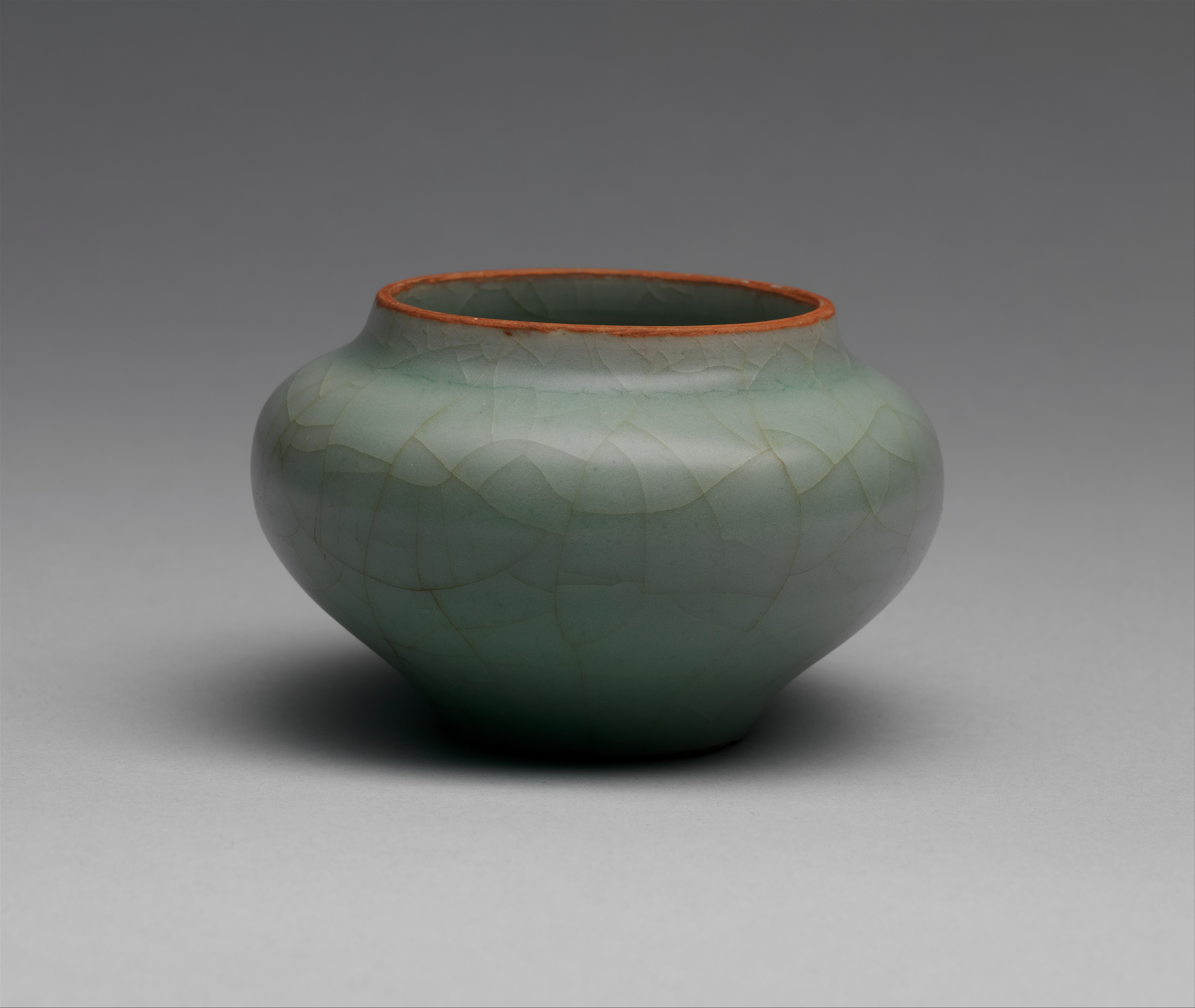

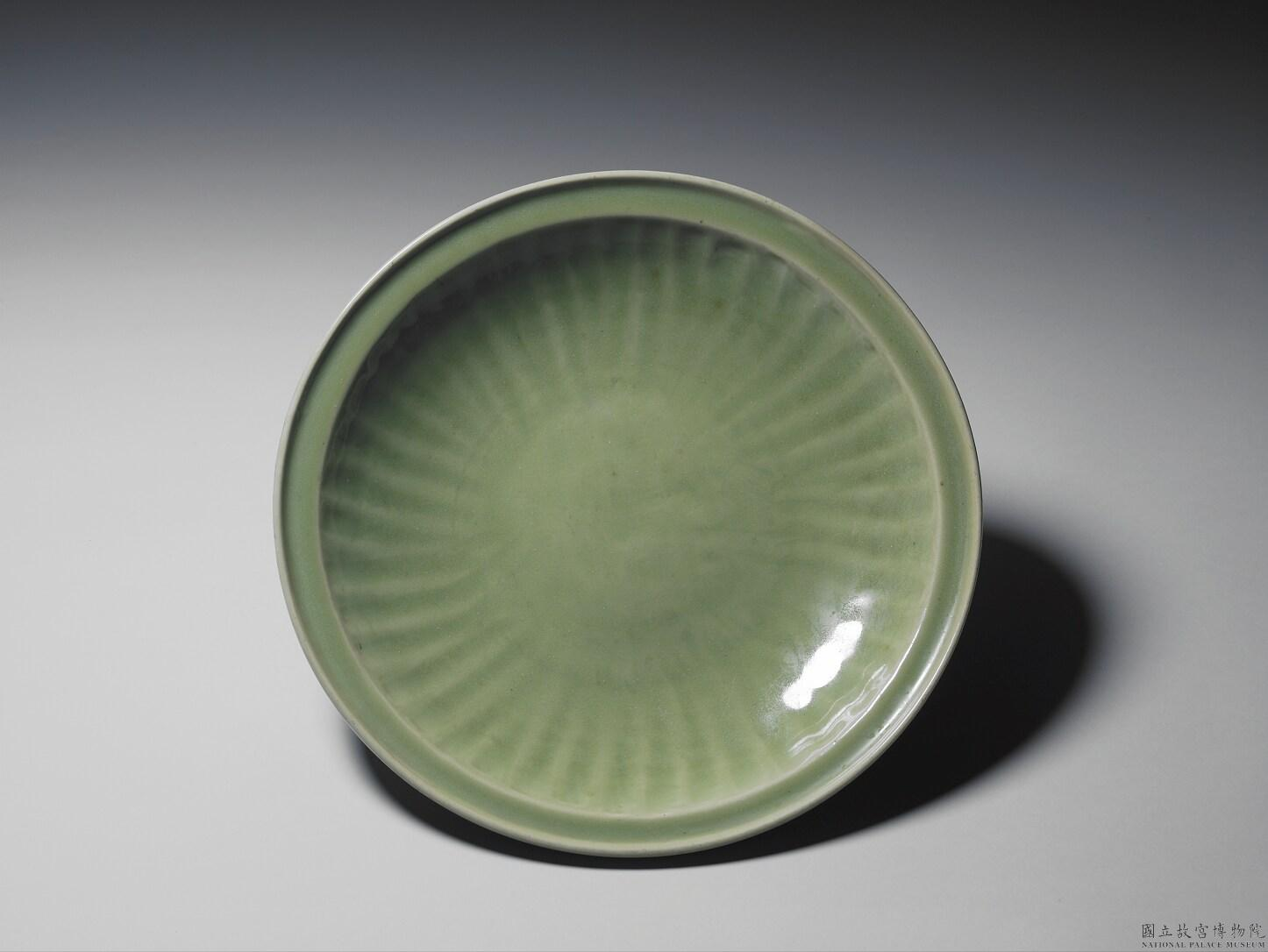

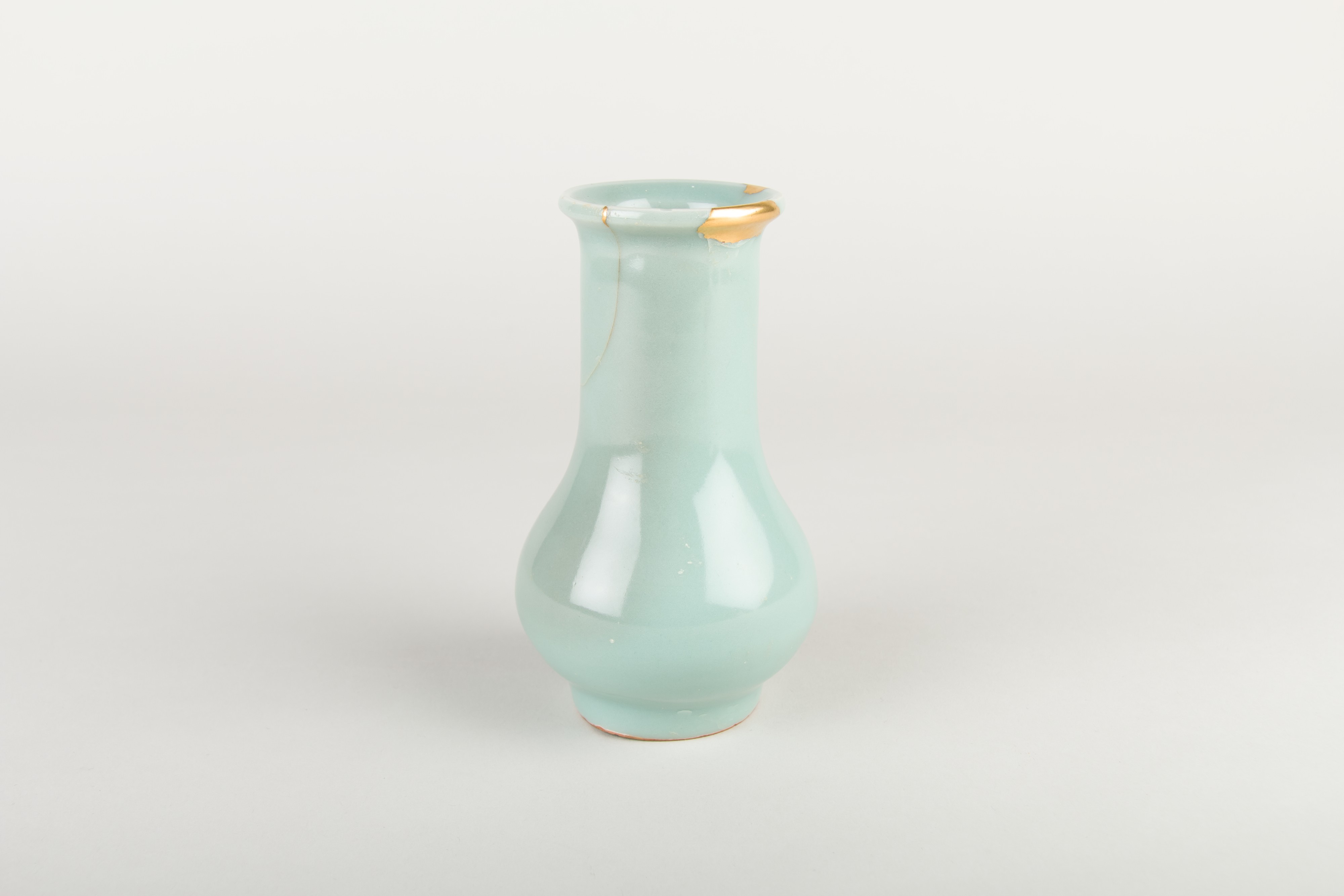

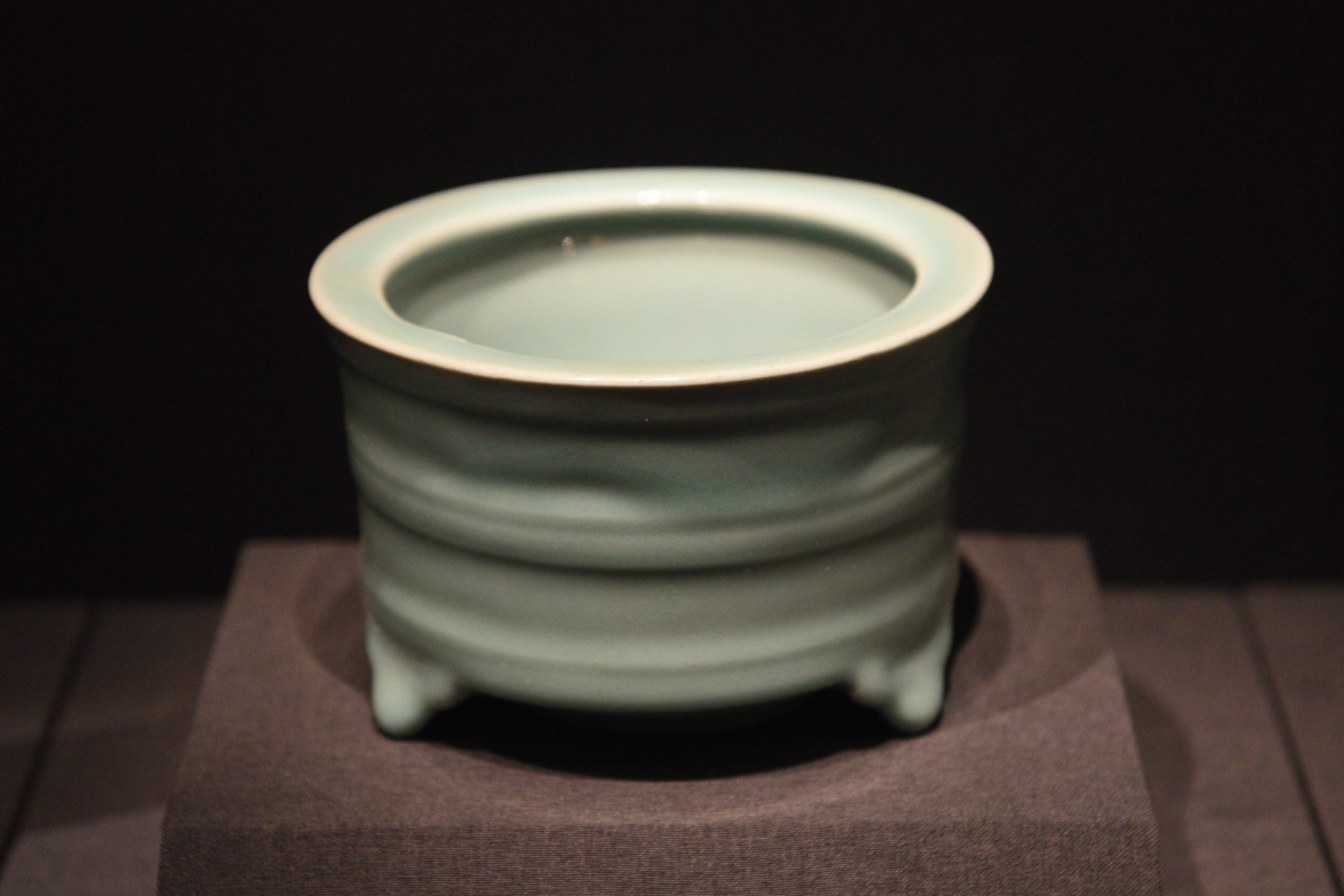

== Markets and later collecting ==
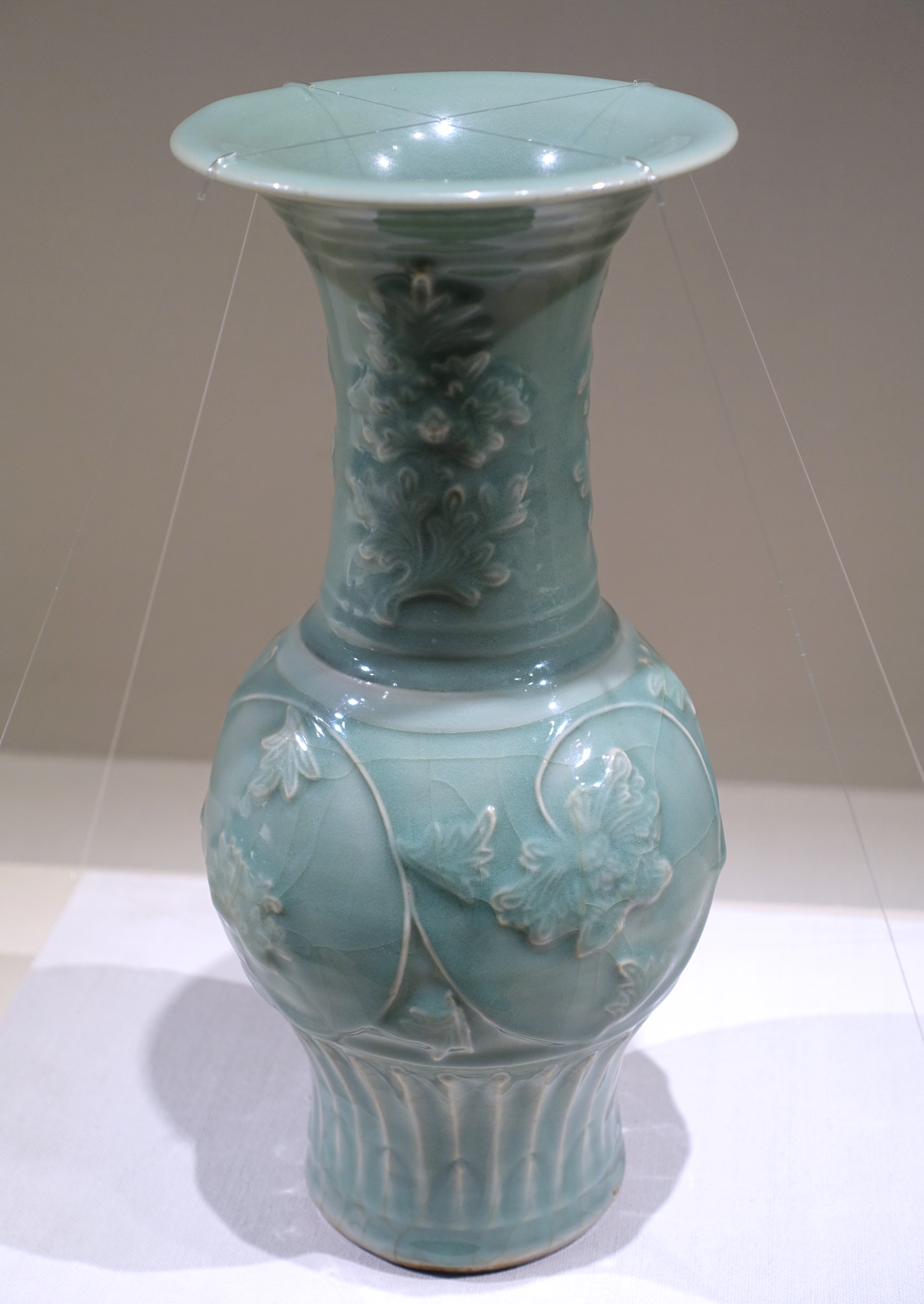
"Blueish green" celadon with applied peony scroll design, Southern Song dynasty, 13th century AD

Unlike Northern Celadon, Longquan ware does not seem to have been used by the imperial court under the Song, although Longquan kilns were used to make the "official" Guan ware, apparently when the Guan kilns could not cope with orders. An important market seems to have been the literati or scholar-gentleman class. As well as wares for ordinary use, they were used on altars and sometimes in burials. Many shapes, especially in the early period, were based on ancient ritual bronze shapes, which were considered appropriate to religious functions, though these lacked the complex surface decoration of the bronze originals. These were also exported in great numbers and, at least in South-East Asian countries such as Japan and Korea, these associations could also be appreciated by local literati, and indeed clergy, as many of the best survivals are in temples.

Japan was a large-scale and enthusiastic importer, and the beach at Kamakura, the capital during the height of Longquan production, had some 50,000 Longquan sherds, thought to have been broken pieces dumped at the end of the voyage from China. Japan soon began to imitate Longquan wares, and has continued to do so, both in mass-produced and studio pottery versions.

There were also large quantities exported west to the Islamic world, and one of the most important collections today is the 1,300 pieces surviving from the collection of the Ottoman Emperors, most now in the Topkapi Palace in Istanbul. Their worth was increased by a belief in the Middle East and Europe that the pieces would break or change colour if poison was placed on them. Fragments have also been found along the East African coast, as far south as Kenya and Tanzania.

A Song dynasty Longquan celadon in the British Museum

A very few pieces reached Europe by trade or diplomatic gifts from Islamic countries, and were sometimes given elaborate metalwork mounts, turning them into goblets. Only three surviving Chinese ceramic pieces can be documented as reaching Europe before 1500. Of these, the earliest is the Fonthill Vase (now Dublin), which is qingbai porcelain, but the other two are Longquan celadon. In 1487 Lorenzo de' Medici was presented with a Longquan dish by Qaitbay, the Mamluk Sultan of Egypt. The Katzenelnbogen bowl was bought by an aristocratic German pilgrim in the Holy Land in 1433/34, who on his return had it given a cover and mounts in gilded silver (now Kassel). The Longquan Warham Bowl, traditionally given to New College, Oxford by William Warham, Archbishop of Canterbury by 1532 (now loaned to the Ashmolean Museum), is perhaps a little later, from around 1500, and was given elaborate mounts in gold once in England.

== History ==
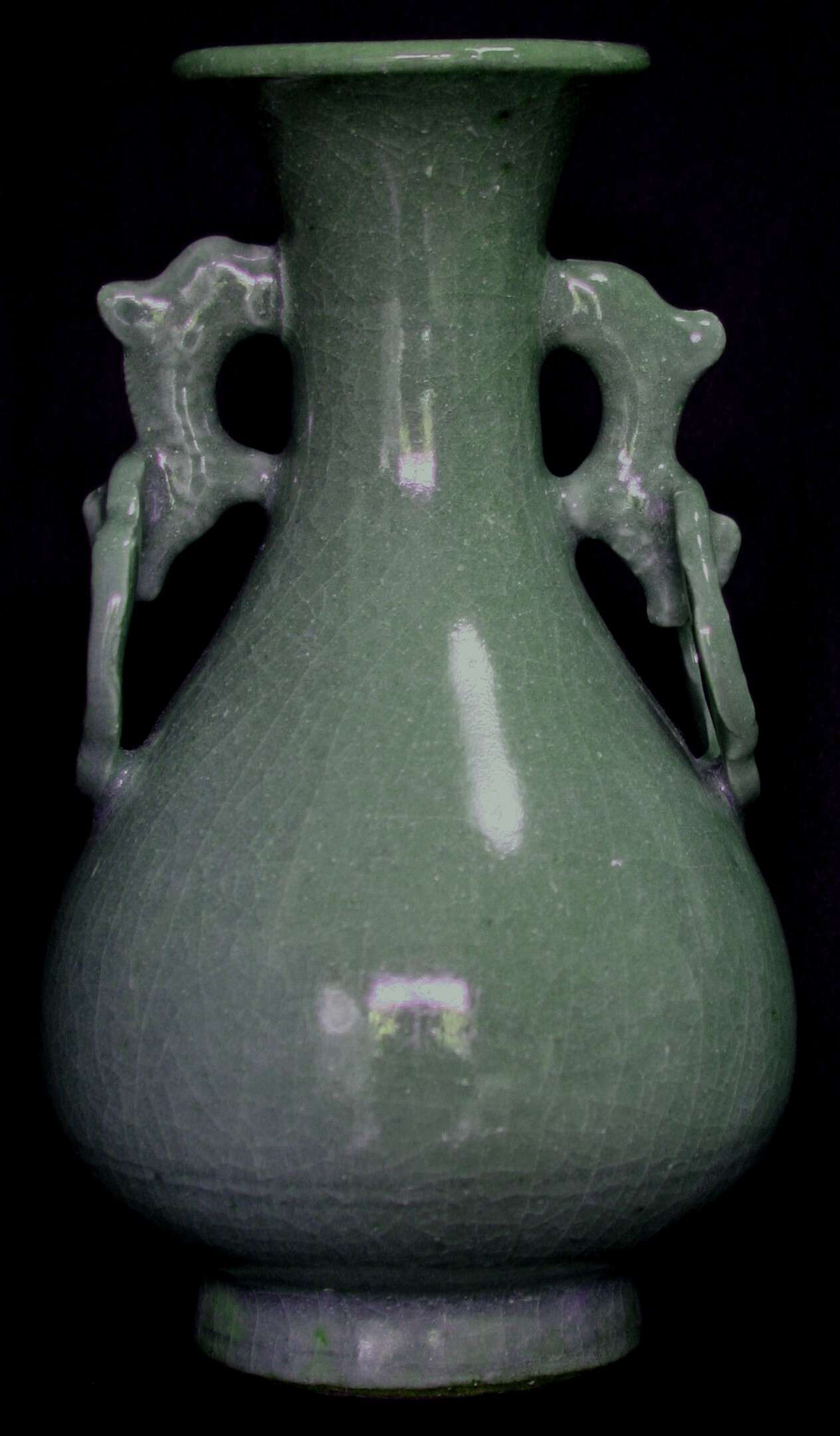
Southern Song dynasty, 13th century, Nantoyōsō Collection, Japan, with crackle

In the Northern Song period the Dayao (大窯) kiln site near Longquan city alone produced wares at twenty-three separate kilns; with Jincun nearby, these appear to have been the largest kiln complexes, and produced the best wares. The era of greatest ceramic production was not until the Southern Song (1127–1279), then continuing in the Yuan (1271–1368) and Ming (1368–1644) periods.

A key event in the rise of Longquan celadon was the flight of the remaining Northern Song court to the south, after they lost control of the north in the disastrous Jin-Song wars of the 1120s. A new Southern Song court was based in Hangzhou, close to Longquan. The Northern Celadon kilns declined as Longquan greatly expanded production. Longquan wares were not from one of the Five Great Kilns later grouped by Chinese connoisseurs, and are rarely mentioned in early writing on the subject, although in the Qing dynasty careful imitations were made.

A story repeated in many sources from the Yuan onwards, with uncertain significance, tells of two brothers called Zhang, both Longquan potters, perhaps in the Southern Song, though this is unclear. The elder brother developed a very special type of ware; rightly or wrongly the later sources say this was distinguished by crackled glaze, and Ge ware (meaning "elder brother ware") is supposed to be this type. The younger brother also developed a fine style of pottery, which is often taken to be the best quality early Longquan ware.

The Southern Song period saw the finest quality, and a great range of colours, as well as a great expansion of production. A count in 1988 by a Chinese archaeologist of the starts of new kilns gave 39 from the Northern Song, 61 from the Southern Song, and over 70 from the Yuan. The percentage figures for those still producing in the 20th century were 23%, <10% and <5%, indicating a bubble of over-production, which only the strongest kilns survived.

Quality declined during the 14th century, although initially production and exports continued to grow. By the middle of the century Jingdezhen ware was being made as blue and white porcelain, and this spectacular new ware gradually replaced Longquan celadon in many of its markets. Floods and war seem to have brought some kilns to an abrupt end; some excavated kilns lie deep under soil deposited in flooding. However, even the stoutly potted celadons of the Ming period have had their imitators at Jingdezhen and in Japan. A sunken trade vessel was found in Sinan County off the Korean coast in 1976, whose cargo included over 9,600 pieces of celadon from the Yuan period, though not of the highest quality. These were probably bound for Japan; there was a single religious statuette. Sunk in 1323, the finds made it clear that Song types had continued to be produced later than was thought.

Longquan celadon enjoyed a final period of high achievement under the early Ming dynasty, when it was an official kiln operated by and for the court. The floral decorative designs were very similar to those in contemporary Jingdezhen blue and white and also court lacquerwork, suggesting that pattern books were supplied from the centre by court artists. Shapes included large flat dishes that were very difficult to fire. By around the mid-15th century the court ceased its orders, and the decline of the kilns resumed. By the late Ming few kilns survived, and they mostly produced utilitarian wares such as tiles and water pots, as the area continues to do.

From the twentieth century native and foreign enthusiasts and scholars have visited the kiln sites and excavated there. Among modern Chinese scholars, the main kiln sites were first systematically investigated by Chen Wanli in 1928 and 1934, after the sites had been excavated by speculators and art-dealers since 1916.
