= Yaozhou ware =

Chinese pottery style

Yaozhao ware
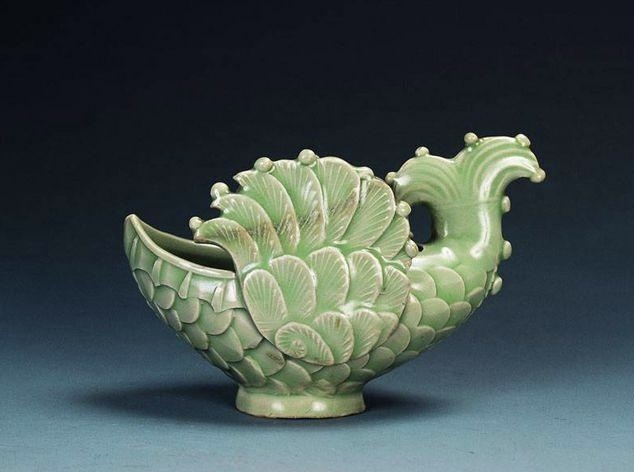
- Yaozhou ware sky-blue glazed water dropper in the shape of a flying fish, Five Dynasties period (907–960). Liaoning Provincial Museum.
- Branch: Chinese ceramics
- Years active: Tang – Yuan dynasty (8th–14th century); peak during Northern Song
- Location: Huangbao, Tongchuan (ancient Yaozhou), Shaanxi, China
- Influences: Yue ware
- Influenced: Ru ware, Northern celadon tradition, Linru ware, Jiaxian ware

Yaozhou ware (Chinese: 耀州窯; pinyin: Yàozhōu yáo; Wade–Giles: Yao-chou yao) is a type of celadon or greenware in Chinese pottery, which was at its height during the Northern Song dynasty. It is the largest and typically the best of the wares in the group of Northern Celadon wares. It is especially famous for the rich effects achieved by decoration in shallow carving under a green celadon glaze which sinks into the depressions of the carving giving contrasts of light and dark shades.

Although "the term Northern Celadon has never been regarded as anything but vague and unsatisfactory", and the Yaozhou kiln site has been known for a long time, some scholars have felt that the wider term retains its usefulness as an umbrella category and because of the difficulty of distinguishing Yaozhou wares from those of other sites. The most important of these are at Linru and Baofeng in Henan, but their quality is regarded as inferior to Yaozhou, although the bodies are extremely similar, and the range of glaze colours overlap. The "products are only distinguishable by very small technical differences in the carved wares and of style in the moulded ones".

== Characteristics ==
Yaozhou and the other Northern Celadons have a clay body that fires to a light grey under glaze, and a "yellowish to olive-brown where exposed". The glaze is transparent, at least until later examples, and lacks the opalescence that Longquan celadon received from millions of tiny gas bubbles trapped in the glaze, as well as the grey and blue tints that the green of southern wares could achieve. Instead the colour "tends to yellowish or muddy brown tones", generally where the reducing atmosphere is not strong enough.

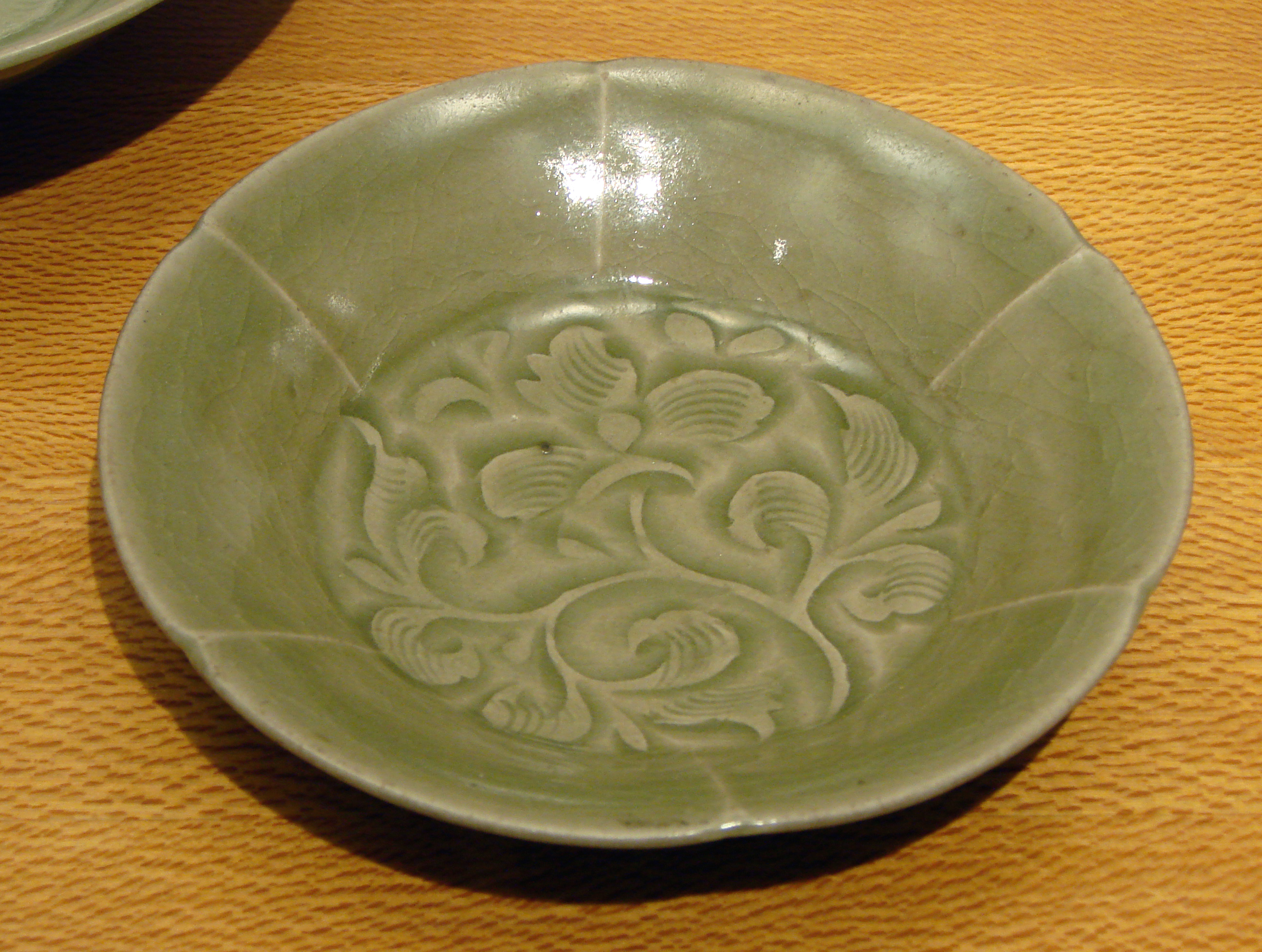
Bowl with carved and combed decoration, Northern Song (compare the moulded example below)

The wares are fired to stoneware, in Western terms, though qualifying as "high-fired" in Chinese terms, which is often translated as porcelain. Like other celadons, the glaze colour is given by iron oxide fired in a reducing atmosphere. The kilns were fired by coal, and until the final years saggars were used. A characteristic northern type of "horseshoe-shaped" or mantou kiln was used, named after the Chinese bun it resembles in shape; one of a group excavated at Yaozhou was unusually well-preserved, allowing accurate plans to be made. Towards the end, after saggars were abandoned, a ring was left unglazed in the centre of vessels, which avoided pieces stacked directly in piles from sticking together, but detracts from their appearance.

Bowls are the most common shape, but there are a wide range of others, including pillows, vases and ewers, and human and animal figurines. The shapes are elegant, and in early wares typically left undecorated. Then shallow carving was introduced, probably performed with a sharpened piece of bamboo, as well as incising and combing smaller details.

Around the end of the Northern Song, the kilns followed Ding ware in introducing the use of moulds for "impressed" decoration of the interior of the relatively flat shapes like bowls, and many complete moulds have been excavated. Moulds became the norm for these shapes, and were made using a turntable and a bat or paddle to force the clay into the design. Unlike Ding ware, where the introduction of moulds added many new motifs, the Northern Celadon moulded designs were generally similar to the carved, but tended to be more complicated. Distinguishing between the two techniques can be difficult, but one way is the small veins in leaves, which in carved examples are very often parallel lines made by a comb, which sometimes reach outside the edge of the leaf, but in moulded pieces vary their angles and width, and are neatly contained within the leaf's outline (contrasting examples illustrated). Generally, the carved technique is preferred, as moulded designs tend to be "crowded and static".

For vertical shapes such as vases and ewers a style of carving floral patterns in deeper relief was developed; these pieces may be known as Dong ware, though the term "has no archaeological foundation". The deeper relief allows similar levels of contrast in the design to the pooling effects on flat surfaces.

== History ==
The Yaozhou Kiln complex, at Huangbaozhen just outside Tongchuan, Shaanxi, began production under the Tang dynasty, when it was notable for three-colour sancai earthenwares, but produced black wares and other types as well. The kiln was some 70 miles from Chang'an (modern Xi'an), capital of the Tang until 904. Although considerably further from Kaifeng, which became the capital of the Song in 960, Yaozhou benefited from the move, as the previous main high-quality celadon Yue ware, from further south, declined. Yaozhou ware was considerably influenced by Yue ware, although the green colour was darker, and the designs usually carved, and later moulded, rather than incised as in Yue ware.

At the end of the Northern Song in 1125, the remainder of the Imperial court fled south, and the capital of the Southern Song was set up at Hangzhou. The nearby Longquan celadon kilns became the main producer of celadon and Yaozhou and the other Northern Celadons declined accordingly, in both quantity and quality, although celadons continued to be produced at Yaozhou until the Yuan dynasty.

After the fall of the Northern Song, Yaozhou itself was ruled by the invading Jin dynasty (1115–1234). It was at this time that the poet Lu You (1125–1209), a refugee from the north as a baby, wrote that Yaozhou greenwares "are extremely coarse and are used only by restaurants because they are durable". This had not always been the case; in the period 1078 to 1106 there are records of Yaozhou presenting wares to the Northern Song court, perhaps filling in a gap in imperial wares of choice as Ding ware began to decline and Ru ware had not been developed.

Yaozhou wares do not seem to have been exported in great quantities, unlike some contemporary and earlier wares, but some fragments have been found in Indonesia and Vietnam. Fragments have also been found in the Aljafería, an 11th-century Islamic palace in southern Spain. Northern Celadon pieces have been excavated from Korean tombs, but none found in Japan. Finds have been made along the Silk Road, and at the Islamic capitals of Fustat near Cairo and Samarra in Iraq. Archaeologist Zhuo Zhenxi has advanced research and study of Yaozhou ware.

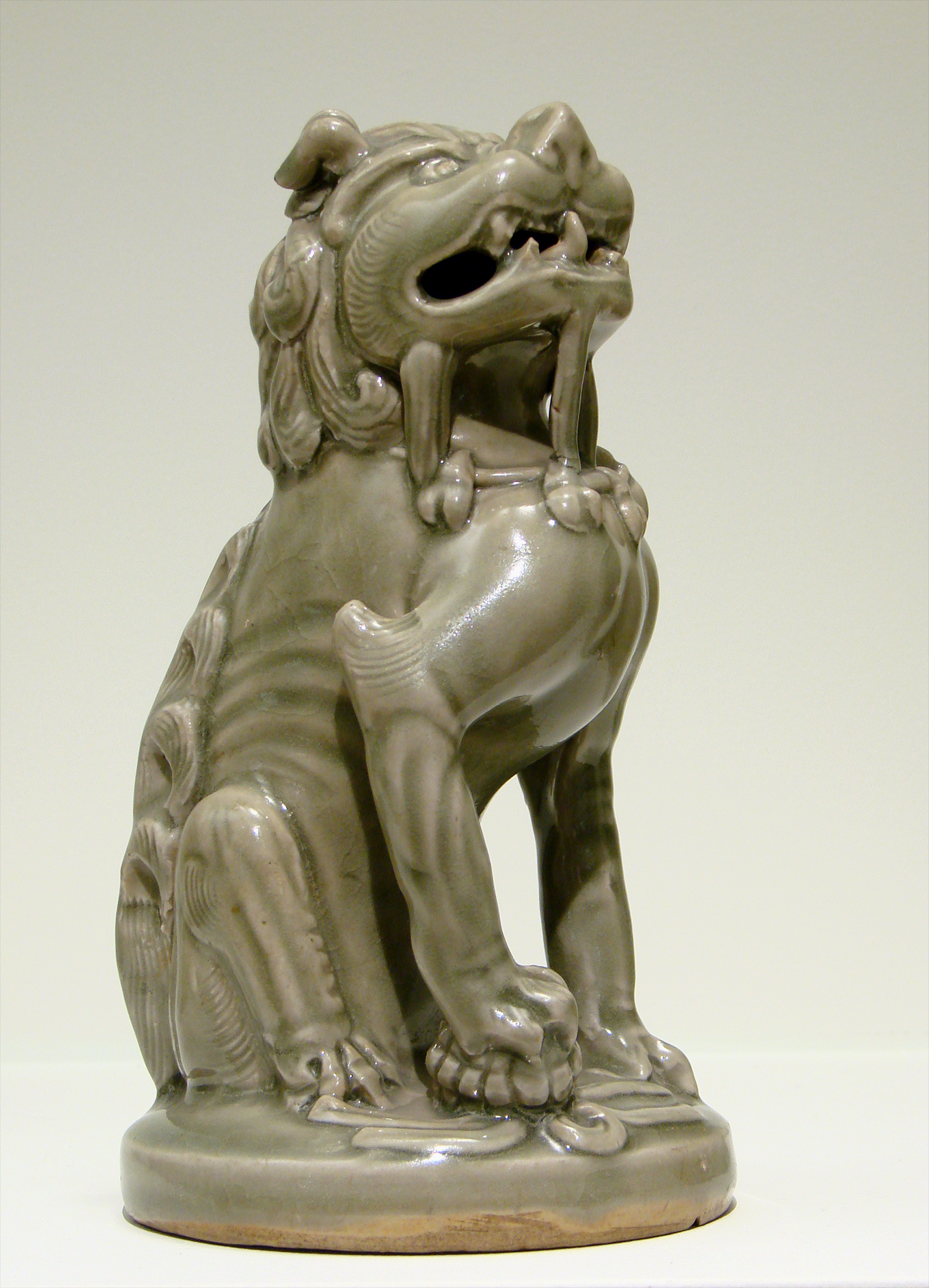
Statuette of a lion, Yaozhou, Northern Song, Guimet Museum

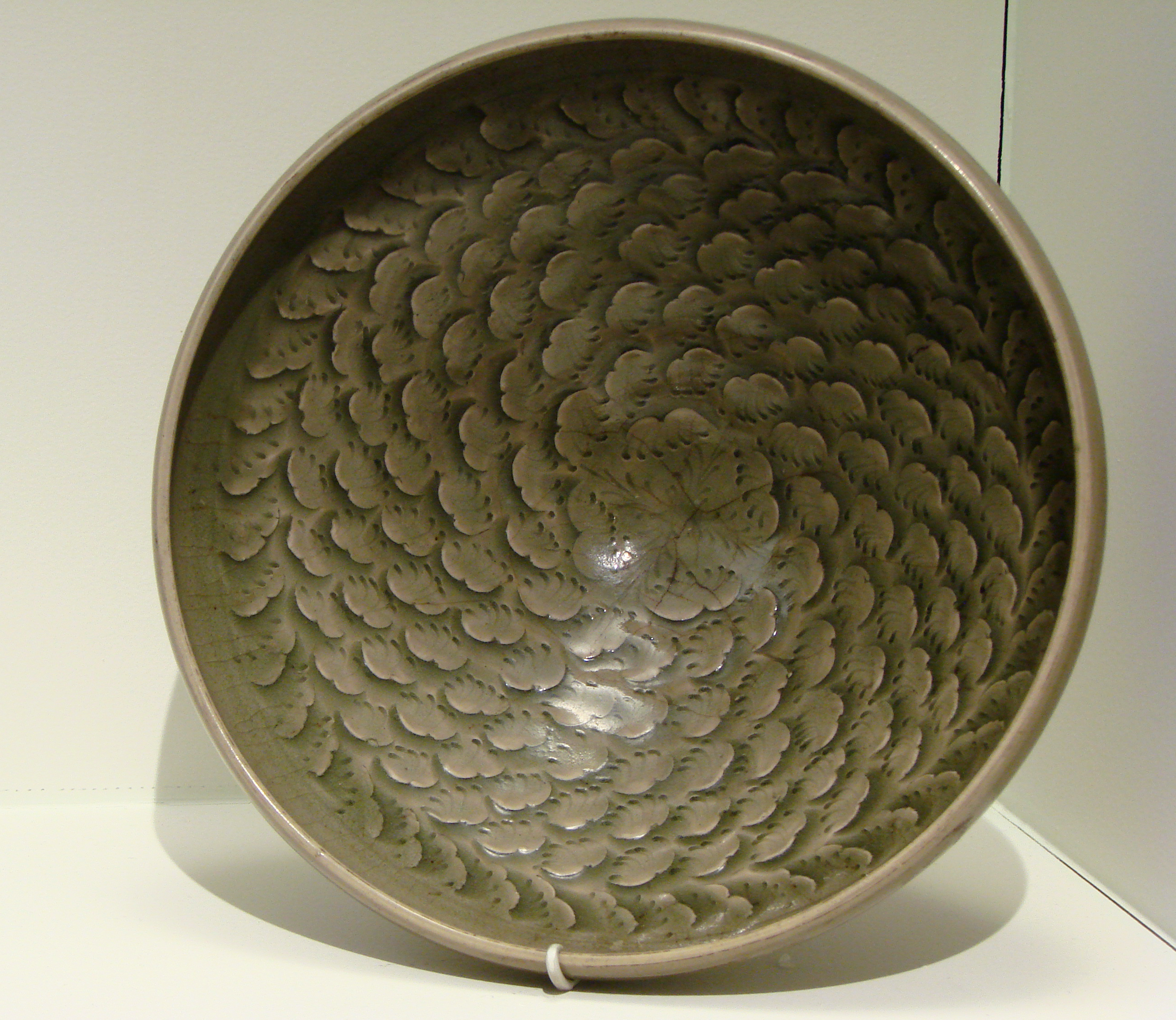
Bowl with carved design, Northern Song, Guimet Museum

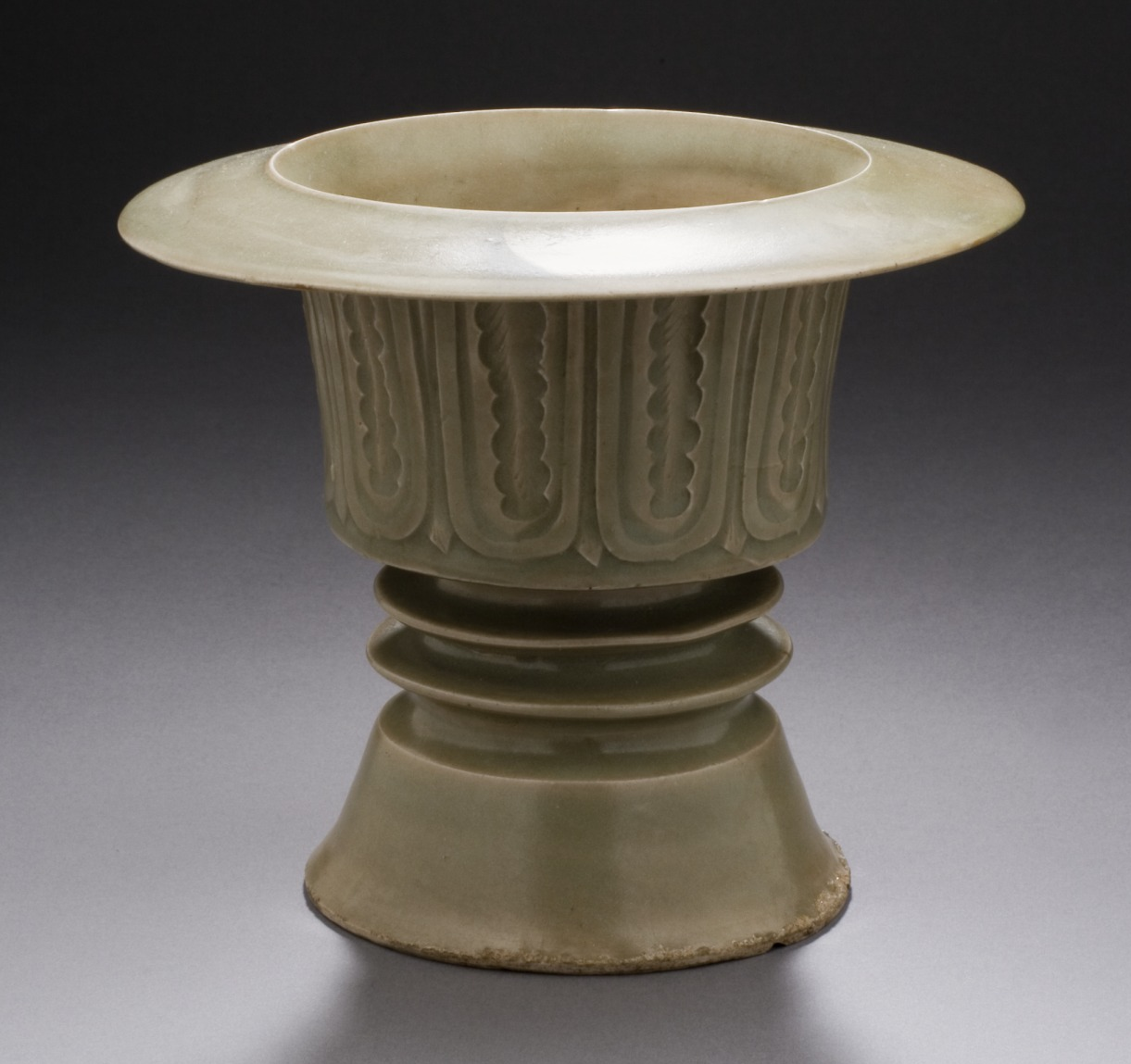
Incense burner, 11th century, Henan, Los Angeles County Museum of Art

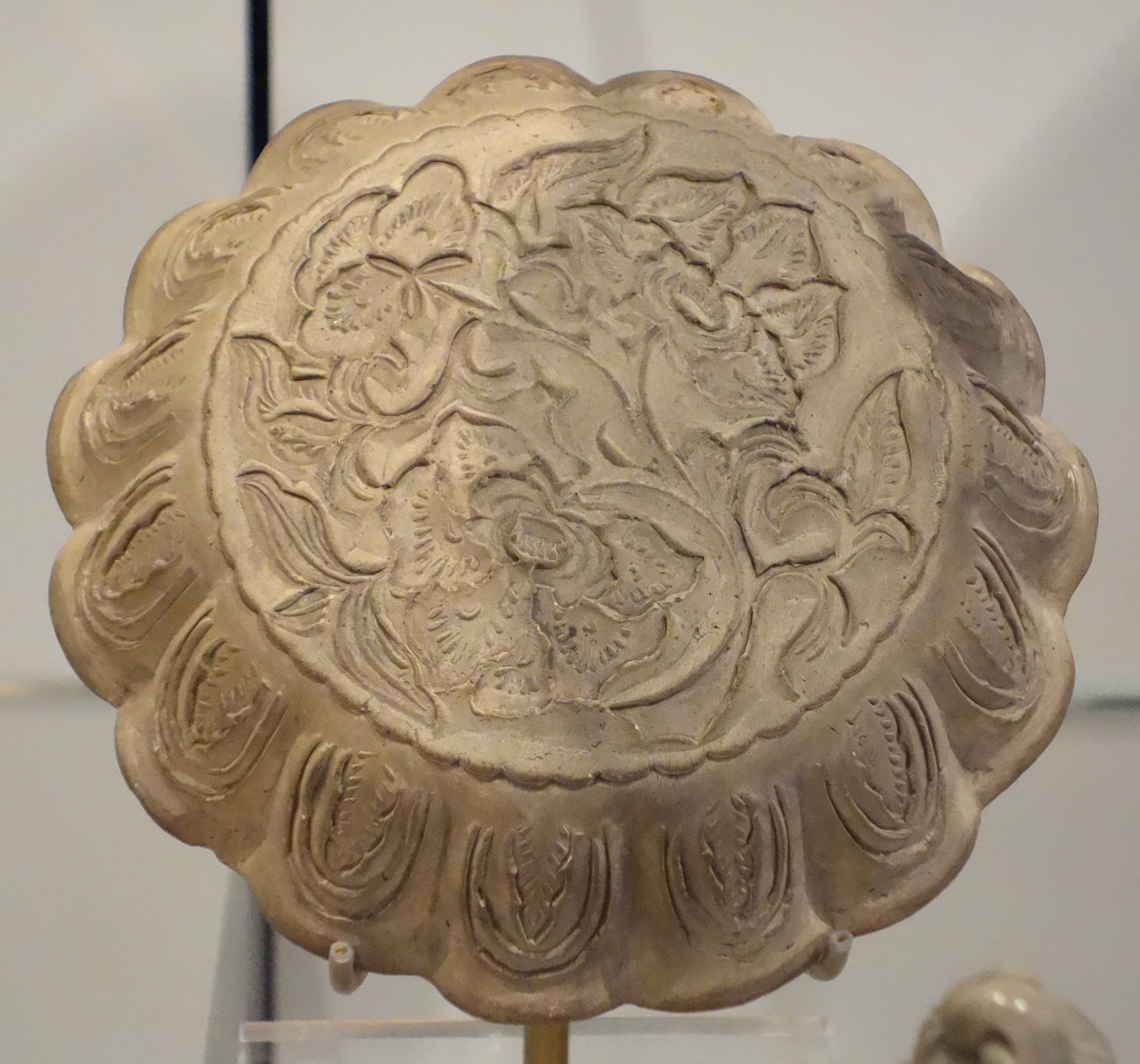
Carved earthenware mould, c. 1065–1127, Royal Ontario Museum

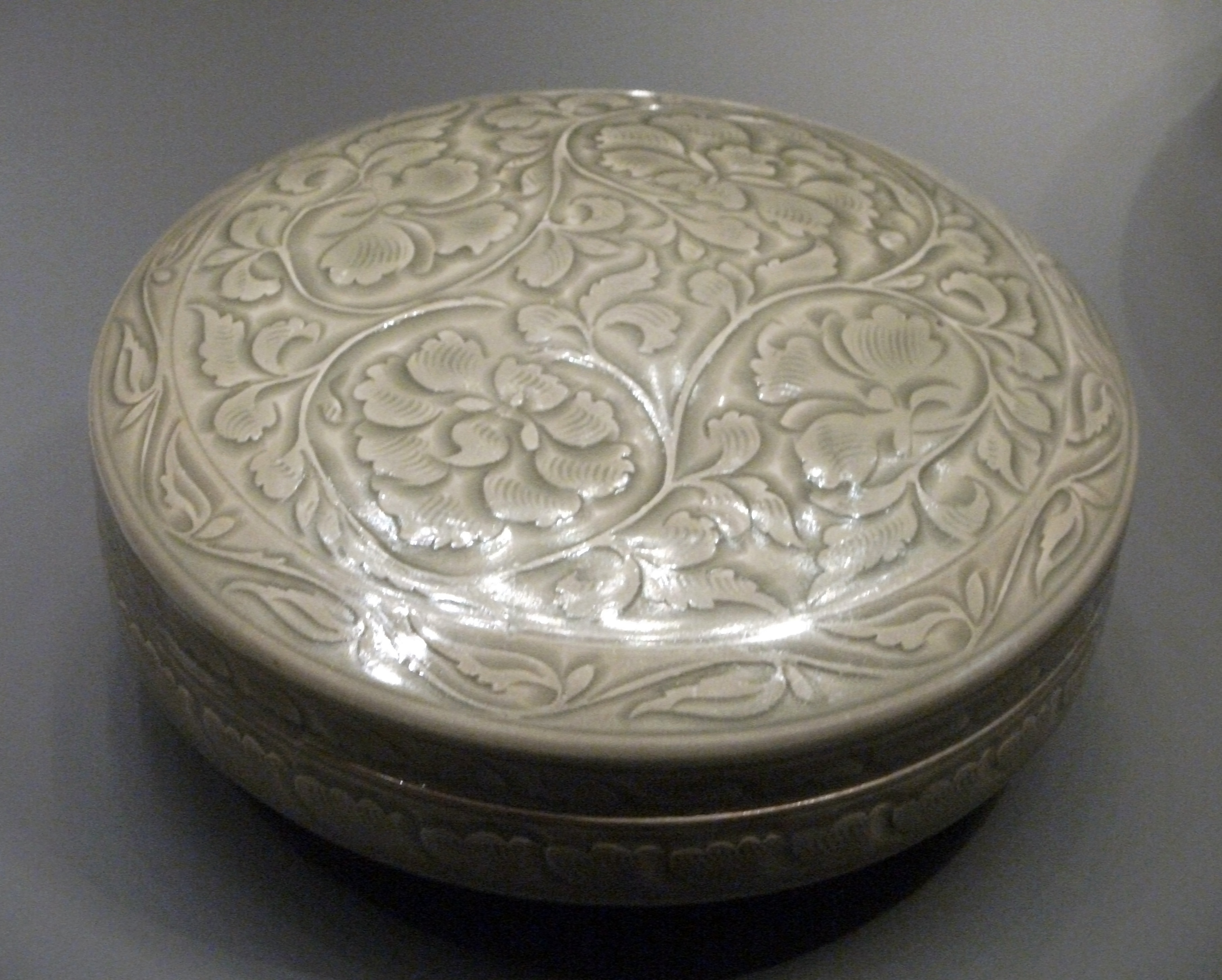
Box decorated with carved peony flowers, British Museum

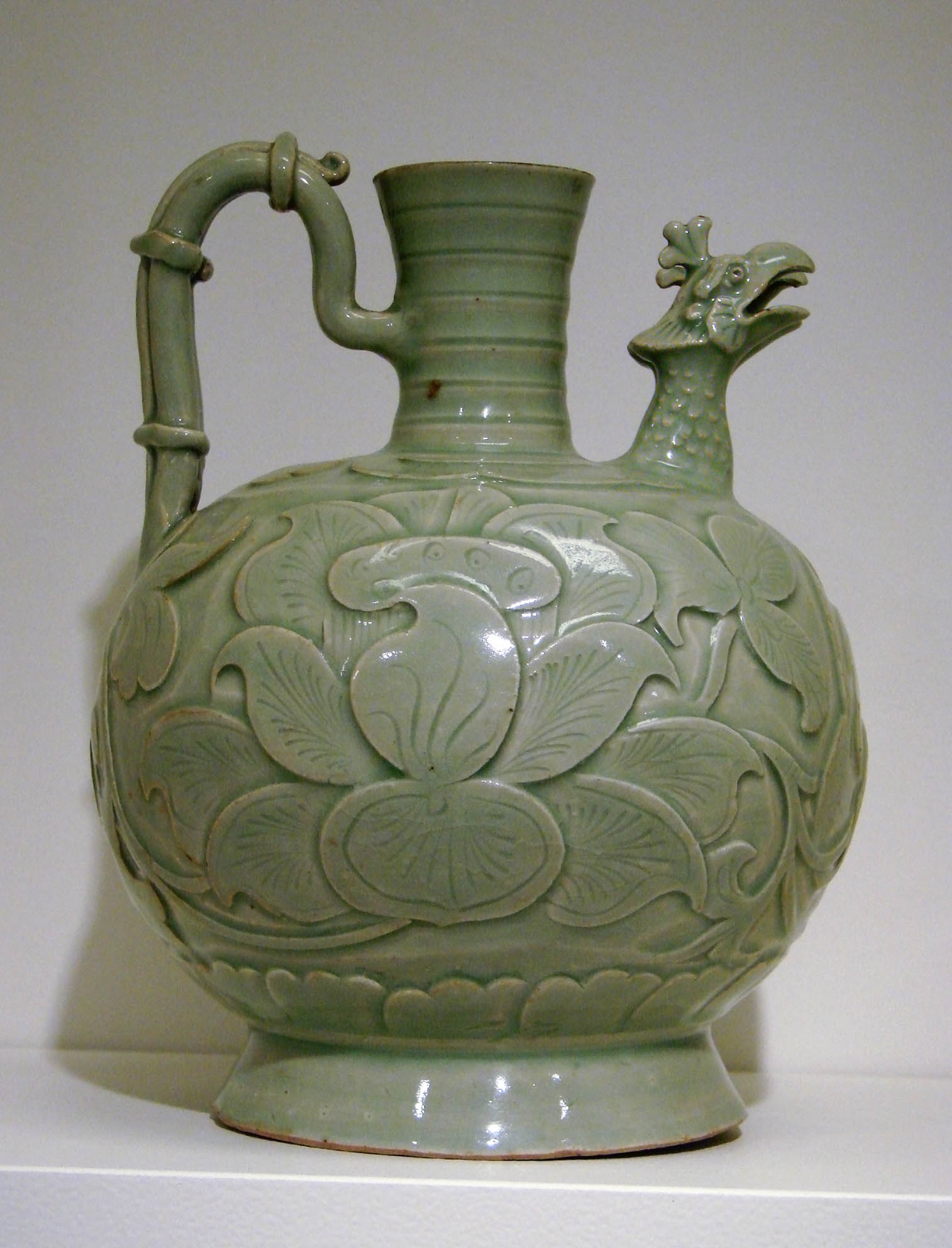
Ewer with chicken-head spout, a distinctive type in Yue ware, then in Northern Celadon. Yaozhou "Dong ware", around 960, carved and incised, Guimet Museum

Cup on a recumbent lion, Yaozhou ware, stoneware with celadon glaze, Jin dynasty (1115–1234), Excavated in 1999 in Hui County, Longnan, Gansu province, H. 9.5 cm, mouth diam. 10.5 cm, base 7 × 5 cm, Gansu Provincial Museum

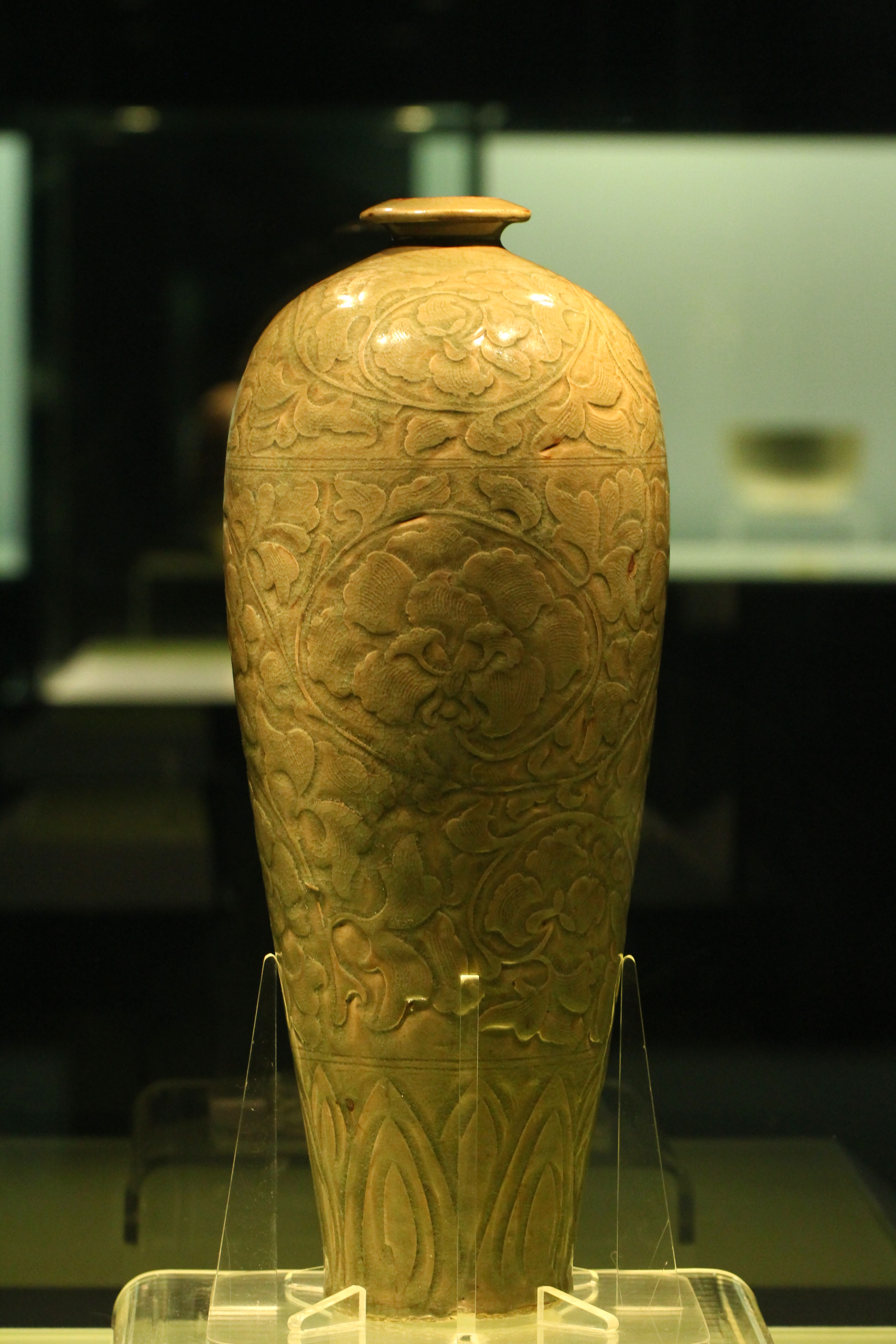
Meiping vase with carved peony scroll, Yaozhou ware, stoneware with celadon glaze, Northern Song dynasty (960–1127), Shanghai Museum

Foliated Saucer, Yaozhou Ware, Cleveland Museum of Art
