= Yaozhou District =

Yaozhou 耀州区
- District
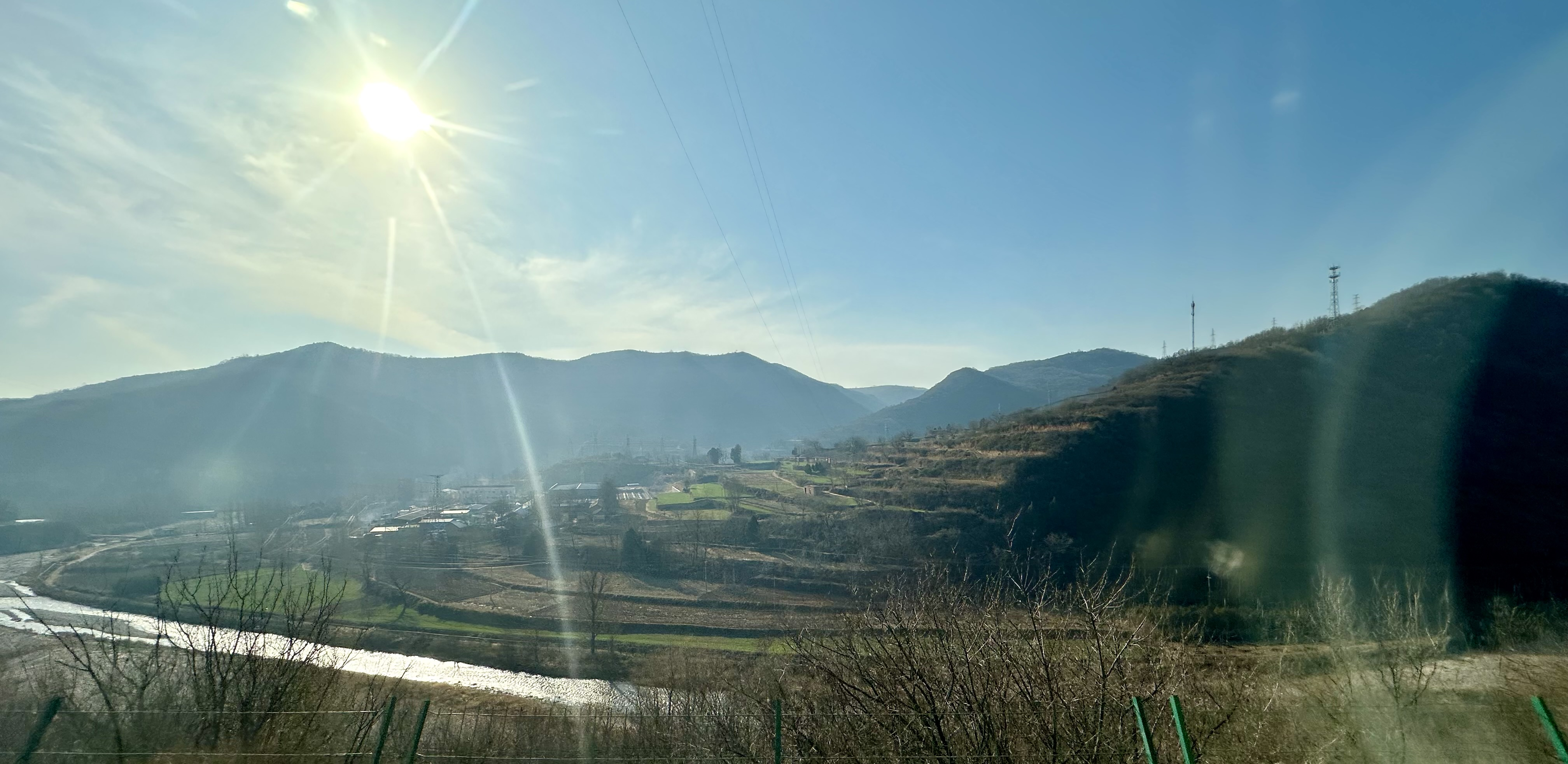

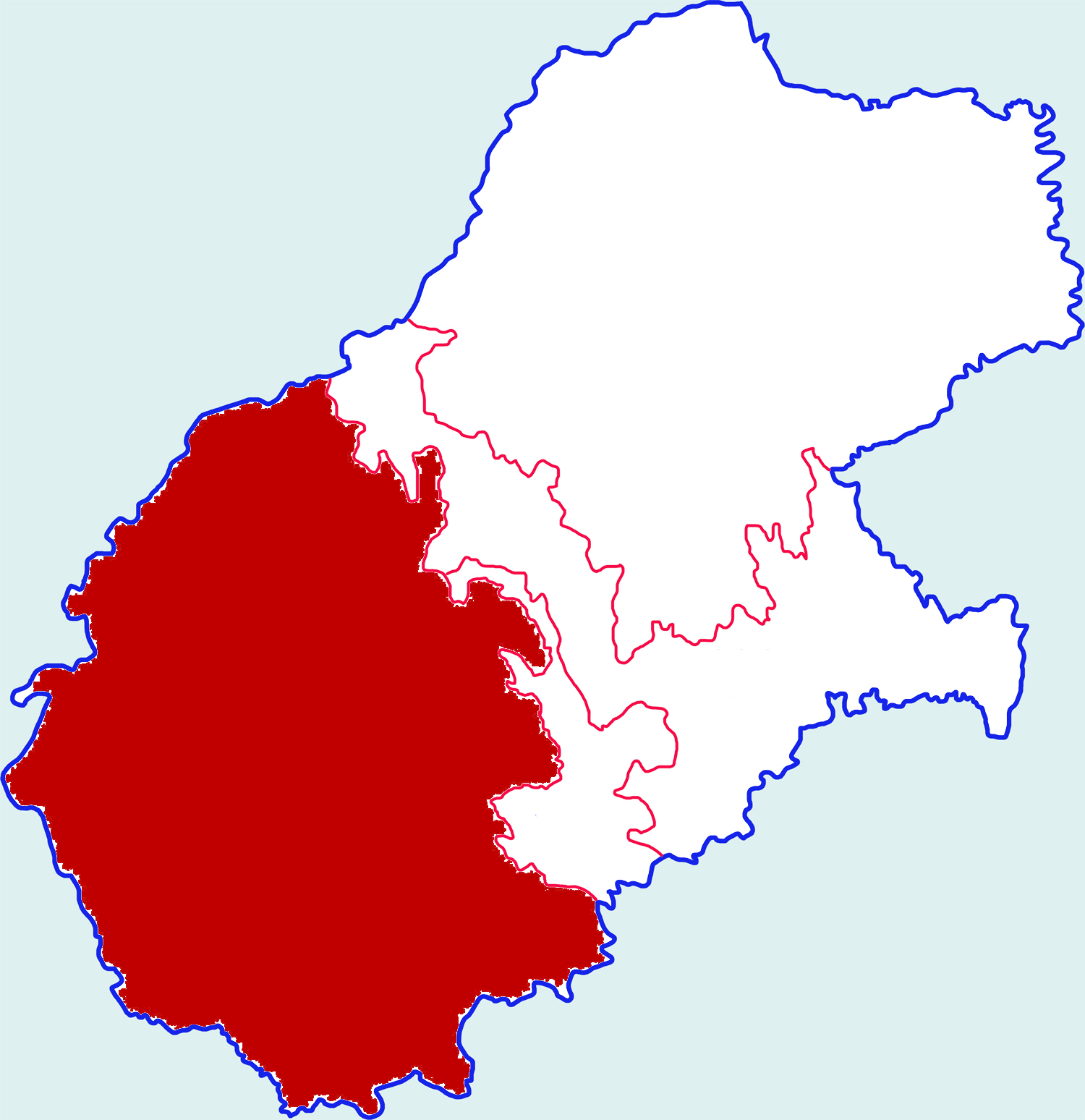
- Yaozhou in Tongchuan

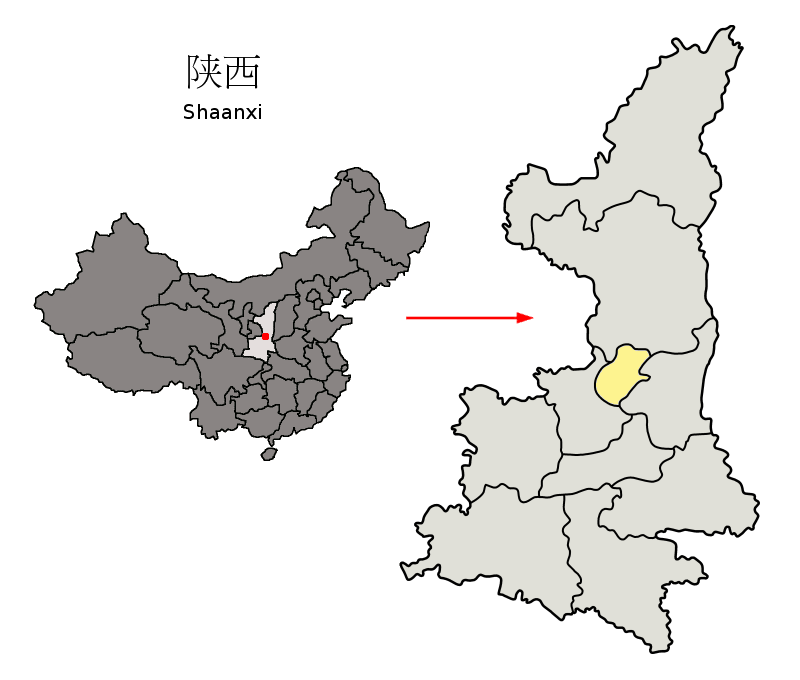
- Tongchuan in Shaanxi
- Coordinates: 34°54′21″N 108°58′36″E
- Country: People's Republic of China
- Province: Shaanxi
- Prefecture-level city: Tongchuan
- Time zone: UTC+8 (China Standard)

Yaozhou District (simplified Chinese: 耀州区; traditional Chinese: 耀州區; pinyin: Yàozhōu Qū), formerly Yao County (simplified Chinese: 耀县; traditional Chinese: 耀縣; pinyin: Yào Xiàn), is a district of the city of Tongchuan, Shaanxi province of the People's Republic of China. It has a total area of 1,617 square kilometres (624 sq mi), occupying the southwest two-fifths of Tongchuan, and a population of approximately 300,000 as of 2002.

In medieval China, Yaozhou was the site of the Yaozhou kilns.

== Administrative divisions ==
Yaozhou District administers two subdistricts, eleven towns and two townships. The subdistricts are Yong'an and Tianbao. The towns are Liulin, Sigou, Miaowan, Dongjiahe, Yaoqu, Sunyuan, Guanzhuang, Potou, Zhaojin, and Xiaoqiu. The townships are Shizhu and Yanchi.

== Climate ==
Climate data for Yaozhou District, elevation 723 m (2,372 ft), (1991–2020 normals, extremes 1972–present)
Month	Jan	Feb	Mar	Apr	May	Jun	Jul	Aug	Sep	Oct	Nov	Dec	Year
Record high °C (°F)	16.7 (62.1)	21.9 (71.4)	29.2 (84.6)	35.8 (96.4)	36.5 (97.7)	39.7 (103.5)	39.7 (103.5)	37.6 (99.7)	37.7 (99.9)	30.8 (87.4)	23.9 (75.0)	22.9 (73.2)	39.7 (103.5)
Mean daily maximum °C (°F)	4.3 (39.7)	8.4 (47.1)	14.4 (57.9)	21.0 (69.8)	25.7 (78.3)	30.0 (86.0)	31.1 (88.0)	29.2 (84.6)	24.2 (75.6)	18.5 (65.3)	11.9 (53.4)	5.8 (42.4)	18.7 (65.7)
Daily mean °C (°F)	−1.0 (30.2)	2.7 (36.9)	8.3 (46.9)	14.5 (58.1)	19.3 (66.7)	23.8 (74.8)	25.6 (78.1)	24.0 (75.2)	19.1 (66.4)	13.1 (55.6)	6.3 (43.3)	0.4 (32.7)	13.0 (55.4)
Mean daily minimum °C (°F)	−4.8 (23.4)	−1.4 (29.5)	3.6 (38.5)	9.1 (48.4)	13.7 (56.7)	18.2 (64.8)	20.9 (69.6)	19.9 (67.8)	15.2 (59.4)	9.1 (48.4)	2.5 (36.5)	−3.2 (26.2)	8.6 (47.4)
Record low °C (°F)	−14.4 (6.1)	−11.4 (11.5)	−8.9 (16.0)	−1.1 (30.0)	3.9 (39.0)	9.9 (49.8)	13.6 (56.5)	12.2 (54.0)	5.6 (42.1)	−3.2 (26.2)	−10.5 (13.1)	−17.9 (−0.2)	−17.9 (−0.2)
Average precipitation mm (inches)	6.7 (0.26)	9.7 (0.38)	17.5 (0.69)	33.1 (1.30)	46.8 (1.84)	62.8 (2.47)	97.5 (3.84)	90.4 (3.56)	86.3 (3.40)	46.3 (1.82)	19.4 (0.76)	4.6 (0.18)	521.1 (20.5)
Average precipitation days (≥ 0.1 mm)	3.7	4.4	5.5	6.7	8.7	8.7	10.3	10.0	11.1	9.0	5.5	3.0	86.6
Average snowy days	5.2	4.3	1.8	0.1	0	0	0	0	0	0	1.8	3.6	16.8
Average relative humidity (%)	54	54	53	55	56	57	68	72	73	70	63	56	61
Mean monthly sunshine hours	165.9	156.6	184.1	209.7	225.7	218.8	215.3	191.1	154.1	154.1	157.9	169.9	2,203.2
Percentage possible sunshine	53	50	49	53	52	51	49	46	42	45	52	56	50
Source: China Meteorological Administration all-time extreme temperature
