= Tiger Cave Kiln =

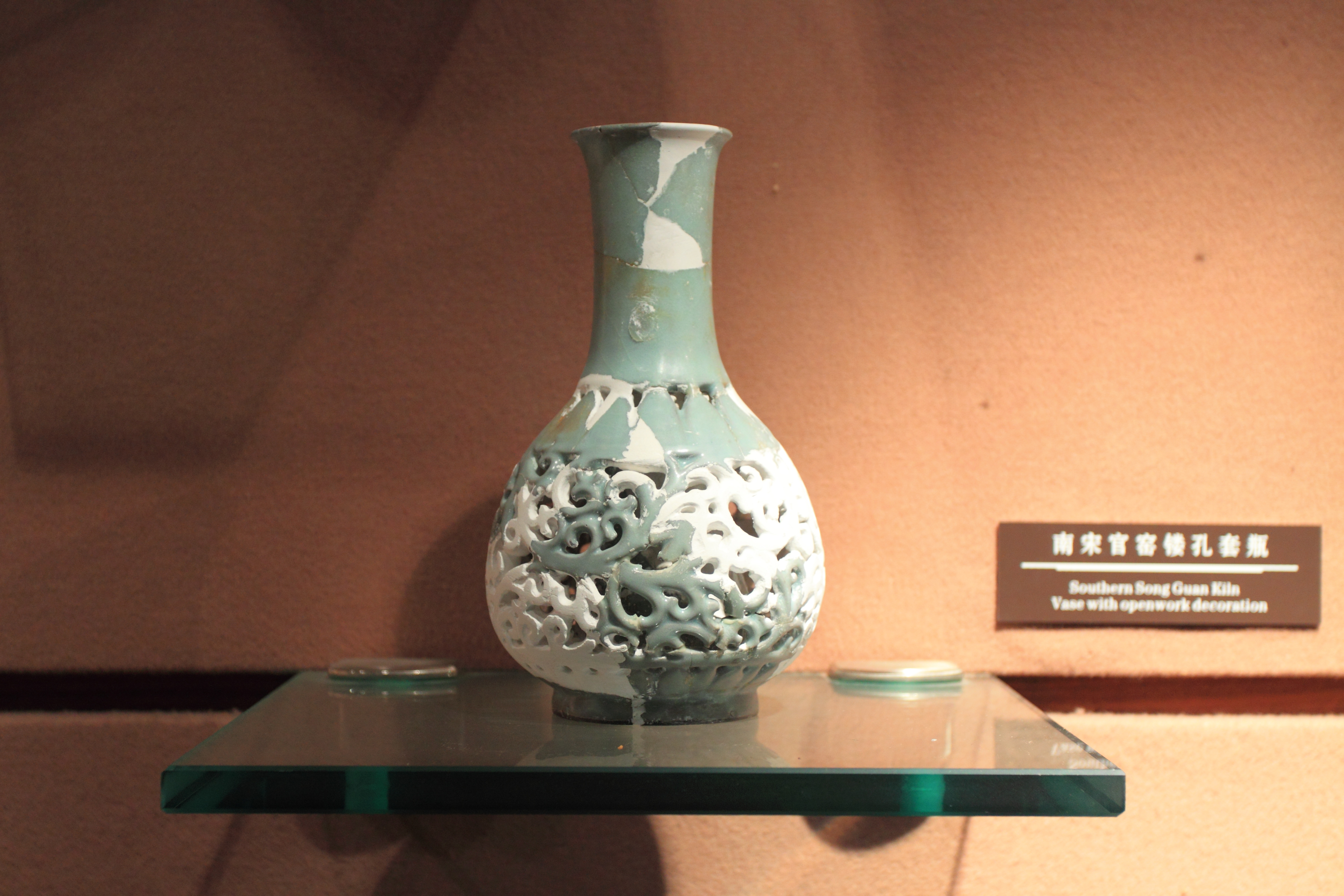
Reconstructed vase from the museum at the site

Archaeological excavations at the Tiger Cave Kiln (Chinese: 老虎洞窑; pinyin: Lǎohǔdòng Yáo) at Hangzhou in the Chinese province of Zhejiang have helped to identify one site of origin of the important ceramic wares of the Southern Song dynasty known as Guan ware, meaning "official" ware, which were made for the exclusive use of the imperial court.

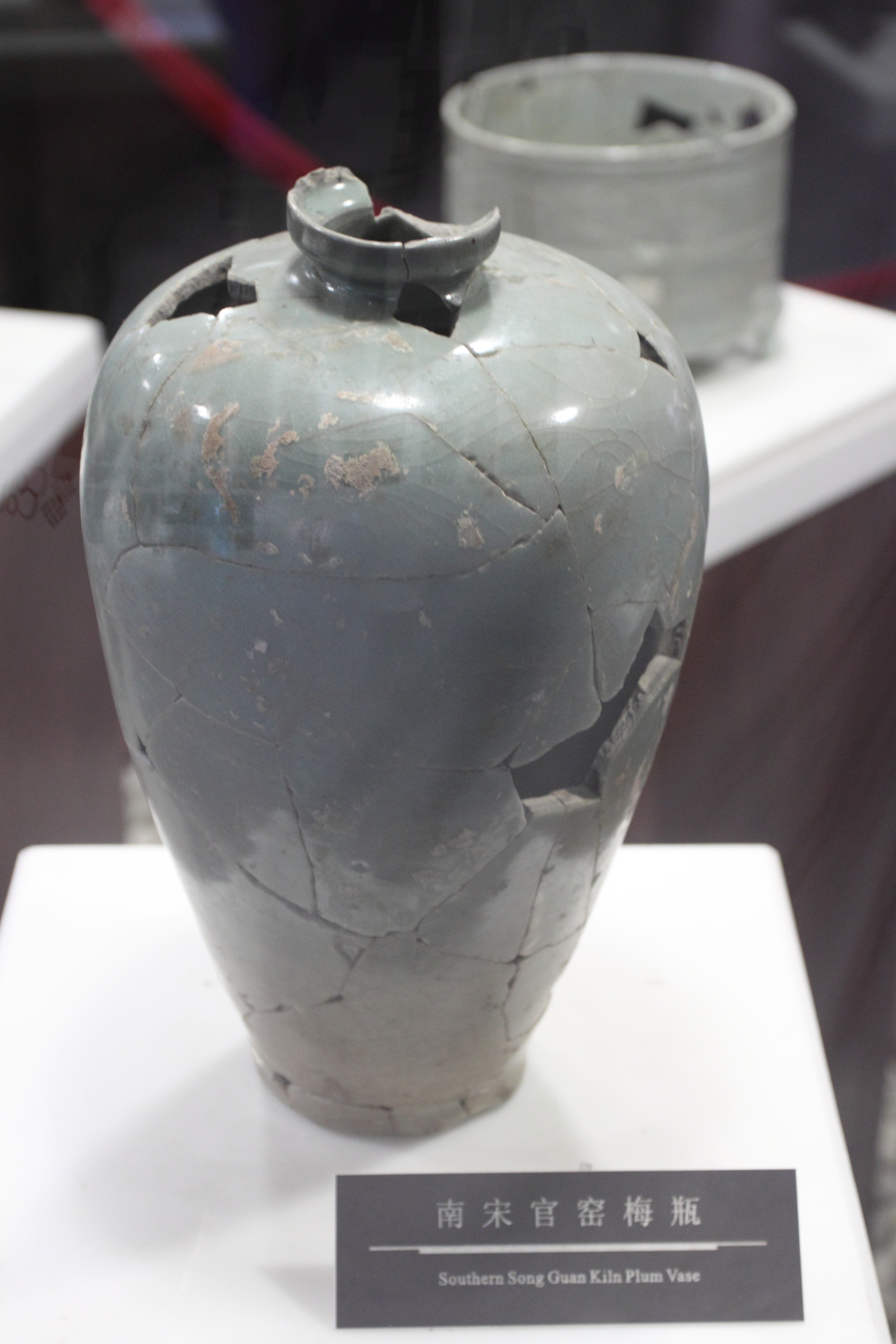
Reconstructed meiping

The Tiger Cave Kiln and other associated ceramic ware sites have come under the control of Hangzhou Southern Song Guan Kiln Museum located in the west area of Turtle Hill of Yuhuang Mountain in Hangzhou, providing a detailed appreciation of the history and aesthetics of some of China's most celebrated ceramics; the museum also contains many ceramics of other origins.

In 1127, under pressure from invading Jurchens, the Northern Song court was driven south of the Yangtze River and in 1138 established a new capital at Hangzhou, in modern Zhejiang province. The move to the south resulted in the abandonment or decline of kilns used to make ceramic wares for the northern court, above all Ru ware, but by 1149 two new kilns had been built at Hangzhou to make porcelain for the newly established Southern Song court; the first kiln under the control of the Xiuneisi (Department of Palace Supply) and the second near to the Jiaotanxia (Altar of Heaven).

The location of the Jiaotanxia kiln was finally established by excavations carried out between 1984 and 1986; but the location of the Xiuneisi kiln remained unknown until excavations started in 1998 at the Tiger Cave kiln site provided confirmation that this was the hitherto unidentified Xiuneisi kiln.

== Excavations at the site ==
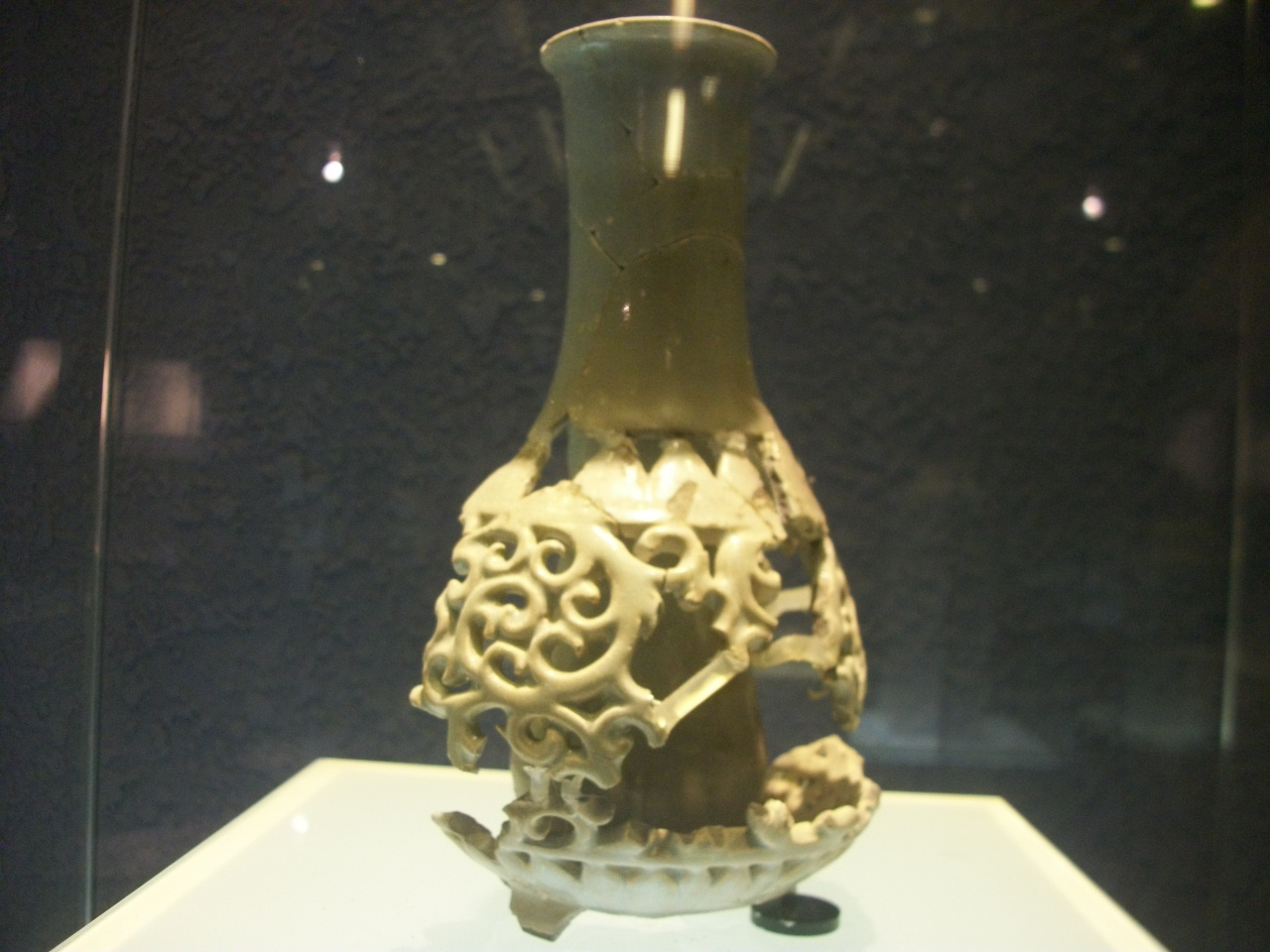
Fragmentary double layer vase

From 1998 to 2001 the Hangzhou Institute of Cultural Relics and Archaeology (杭州市文物考古所) excavated the Laohudong (Tiger Cave) Kiln. The results have rewritten Chinese ceramic history and solved mysteries that have haunted the field for literally hundreds of years. Excavated shards fall within the historical range of the Southern Song (1127-1279) to the Yuan dynasty (1271-1368). The Southern Song celadon sherds show clearly that the Tiger cave Kiln was the ceramic production site for Southern Song Guan (official) ware. Tiger Cave is a seven hundred meter area located between Phoenix Mountain and Nine Flowers Mountain. The site is not more than a hundred meters from the north wall area of the Southern Song Imperial City area. Likewise it is two and a half miles from another Song production area known as the Jiaotanxia Kiln (郊坛下窑).

The discovery of the Kiln site took place on September 20, 1996 after an extensive archeological search of the area. Southern Song shards display shapes that correspond to ritual vessels such as celadon vases and incense burners. Clearly the original objects were intended for palace use. The shards are primarily of a powder blue color. Next in number are those of a honey tint. The celadon shards display a rich thick glaze with prominent crackle and crazing. Clearly the kiln site is the long lost Official Ceramic Ware site referred to in historical texts as the Xiuneisi Official Ware Kiln (修内司窑). The Mongol Period strata of the archaeological site perhaps solves another long standing ceramic history mystery i.e. that of Ge ware. After the fall of the Southern Song court and the unification of the Chinese nation under Mongol rule the Tiger Kiln maintained production. A portion of the ceramic production of this period continued to be celadon ware in the official (guan) ware style. This conforms to period historical references.

== Southern Song guan wares ==
The Percival David Foundation has in its collection, now in the British Museum on loan, a number of pieces that some scholars believe were made at the Xiuneisi (Department of Palace Supply) kiln; a kiln which has now been identified as the Laohudong (Tiger Cave) kiln.
