= Ye Zhemin =

Chinese art historian

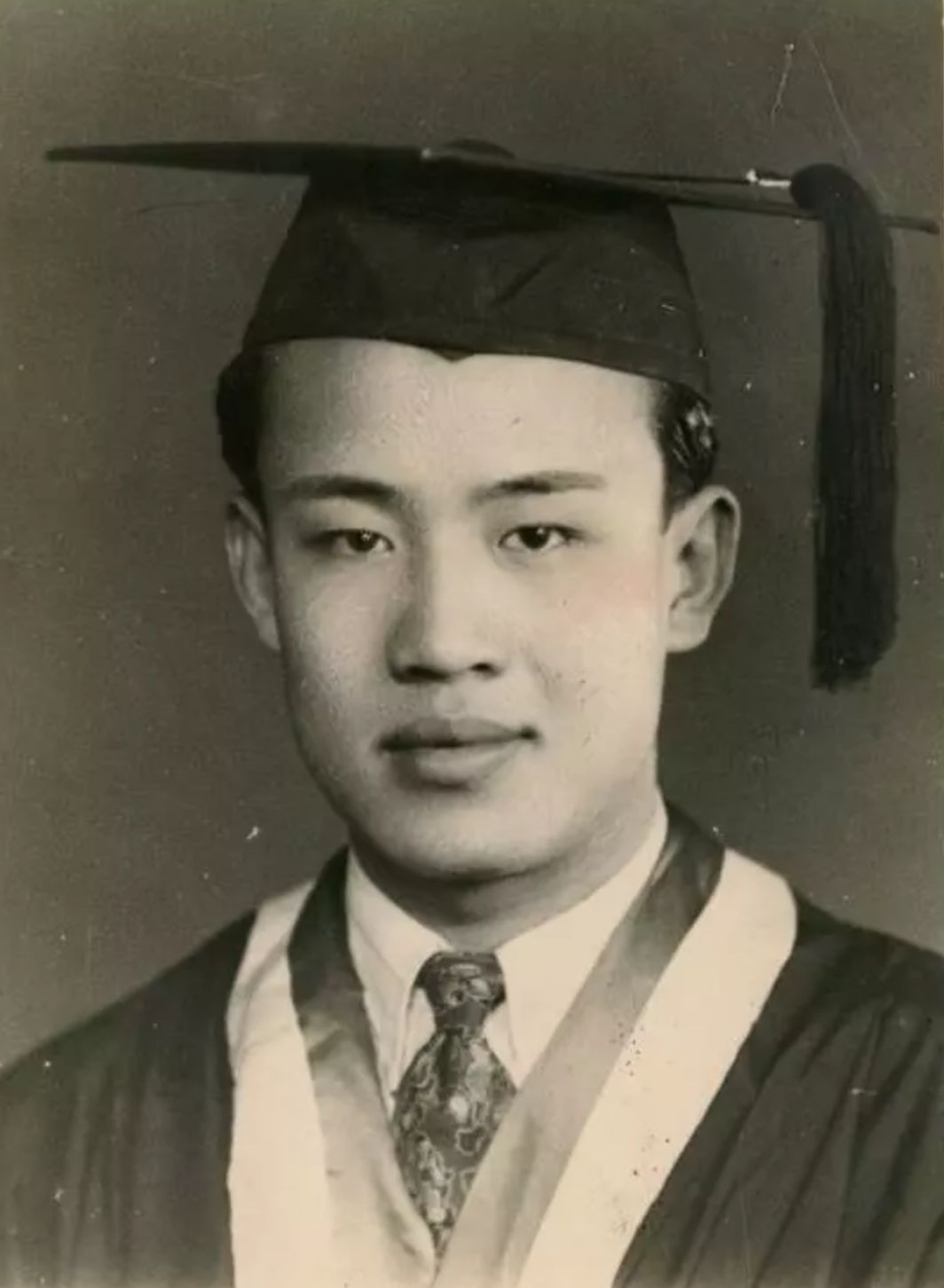
Ye Zhemin at his graduation from Peking University

Ye Zhemin (simplified Chinese: 叶喆民; traditional Chinese: 葉喆民; 1924 – 2 January 2018), also romanized as Yeh Che-min, was a Chinese art historian and authority on the history of Chinese ceramics and calligraphy. He is credited with making a discovery that led to the identification of Qingliangsi as the kiln site for the rare Ru ware of the Song dynasty. His published works include the extensive History of Chinese Pottery and Porcelain.

== Life and career ==
Ye Zhemin was born in 1924 into a Manchu family that descended from the Qing dynasty poet Nalan Xingde. His father, Ye Linzhi 叶麟趾, was a historian of Chinese ceramics who discovered the Ding ware kiln site. Ye studied history of ceramics with his father from a young age, and later attended Peking University, where he studied art and calligraphy under Xu Beihong, Luo Fukan, and Pu Xinyu.

After graduation from university, Ye worked at the Palace Museum (Forbidden City) for 16 years. He conducted research at many of China's ancient kiln sites with ceramics experts Chen Wanli 陈万里, Sun Yingzhou 孙瀛洲, and Feng Xianming.

In 1978, Ye was transferred to Central Academy of Arts and Crafts (now Academy of Arts and Design, Tsinghua University) to teach history of Chinese ceramics and history of Chinese calligraphy. In the 1980s and 1990s, he also served as an adjunct professor at Peking University and the Central Academy of Fine Arts, and taught as a visiting professor at more than 10 universities abroad. The lectures he gave in Europe were collectively published in the book Chinese Ceramics in 2000.

== Contributions ==
In 1977, while surveying the Qingliangsi archaeological site in Baofeng County, Henan, Ye found a sherd of pottery that was typical of Ru ware. Ru ware is an extremely rare and precious type of pottery from the Song dynasty, and scholars had spent decades searching for its kiln site. Ye brought the sherd to Guo Yanyi 郭演仪 at the Shanghai Institute of Ceramics, who analyzed its chemical composition and determined that it was nearly identical to that of a known Ru ware plate in the collection of the Palace Museum. The discovery was published in 1985, and Ye proposed Qingliangsi as the probable kiln site for Ru ware. Later archaeological excavations confirmed his proposition.

Ye published more than 100 research papers and over 10 monographs. His History of Chinese Pottery and Porcelain (中国陶瓷史, ISBN 9787108034151), originally published in 2006, provides an extensive history of Chinese ceramics with perspectives from archaeology. His other books include A General Overview of the History of Chinese Calligraphy (中国书法史通论), A General Overview of the Pottery and Porcelain of the Sui, Tang, Song, and Yuan Dynasties (隋唐宋元陶瓷通论), Cizhou Ware of China (中国磁州窑, 2009).

== Death ==
In late November 2017, Ye was hospitalized in Beijing for an illness. When a scholar, who was a student of one of Ye's students, went to visit him at the hospital, he found that Ye was lying in bed in a hallway. He posted a picture on social media, which was widely circulated and raised an outcry in Chinese media against the maltreatment of a renowned scholar. The hospital later moved him into a room, but he died a little more than a month later on 2 January 2018, aged 93.
