= Five Great Kilns =

Chinese kilns from the Song dynasty

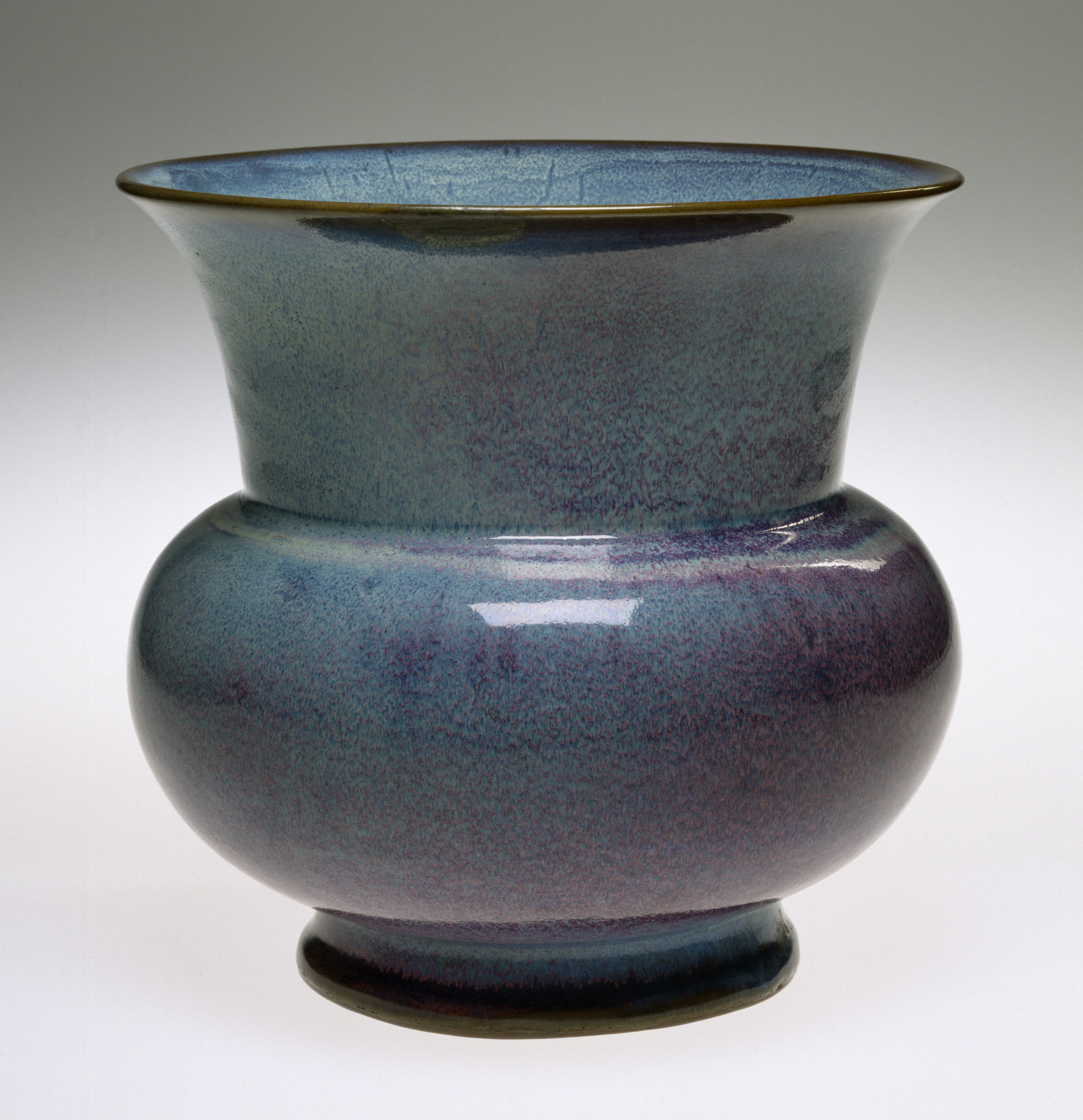
Spittoon stoneware with Jun ware glaze, Song or Ming dynasty

The Five Great Kilns (Chinese: 五大名窯; pinyin: Wǔ dàmíng yáo), also known as Five Famous Kilns, is a generic term for ceramic kilns or wares (in Chinese 窯; yáo can mean either) which produced Chinese ceramics during the Song dynasty (960–1279) that were later held in particularly high esteem. The group were only so called by much later writers, and of the five, only two (Ru and Guan) seem to have produced wares directly ordered by the Imperial court, though all can be of very high quality. All were imitated later, often with considerable success.

All except Ding ware used celadon glazes, and in Western terms the celadon kilns are stoneware, as opposed to the Ding early porcelain. The celadons placed great emphasis on elegant forms and their ceramic glazes, and were otherwise lightly decorated, with no painting.

The five kilns produced respectively:

- Ru ware (汝)
- Jun ware (钧)
- Guan ware (官)
- Ding ware (定)
- Ge ware (哥)

== History of the term ==
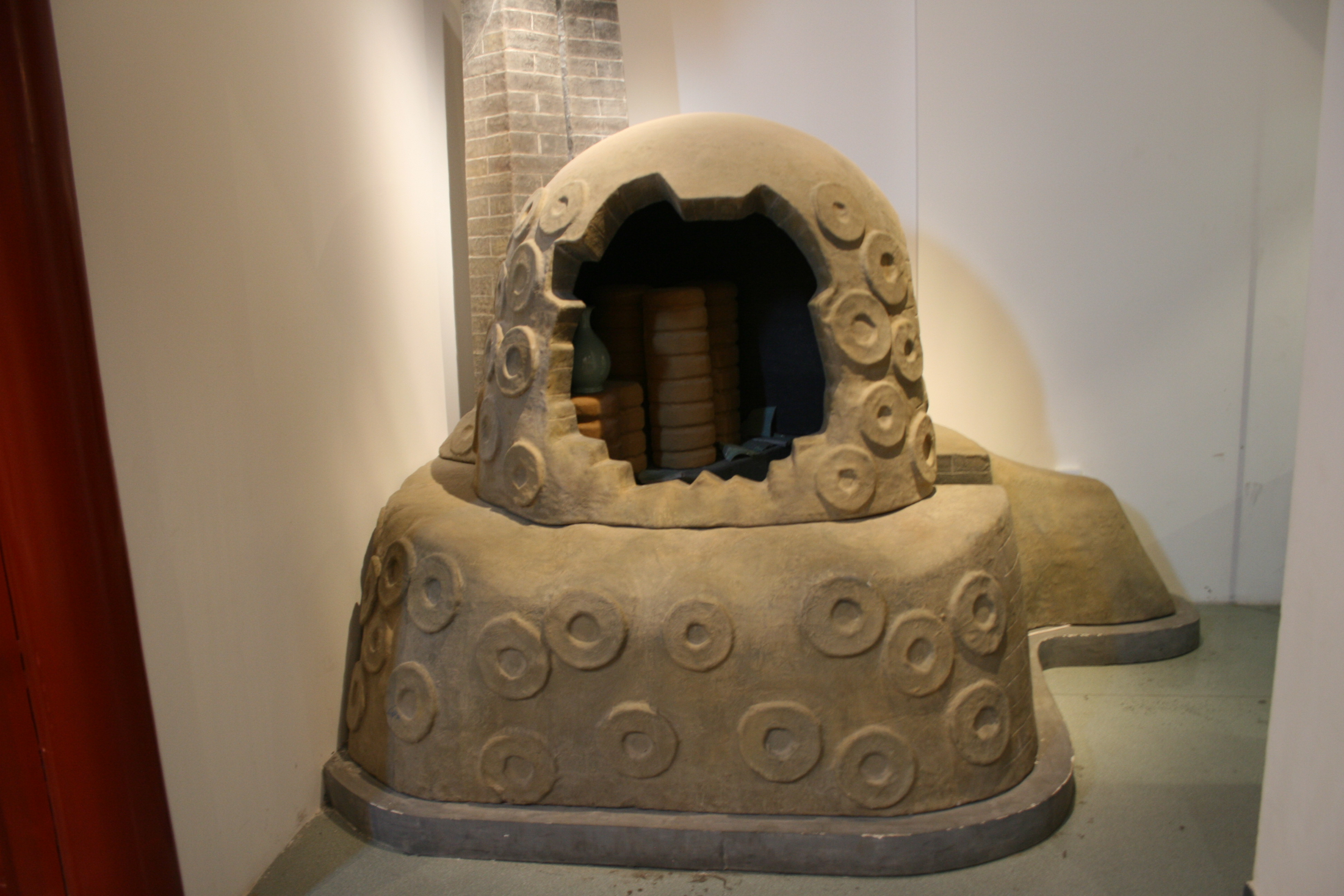
Song dynasty porcelain oven

Although the group and name is generally said in books to have been a coinage by Chinese writers from the Ming or Qing dynasties, a recent paper analysing the main Chinese scholars suggests the modern number and selection of "great kilns", as given here, in fact only dates back to the mid-20th century, with various numbers and other kilns often found in previous writings. In particular, the semi-mythical Chai ware, and Longquan celadon often feature in earlier groupings, and Jun ware is often omitted.

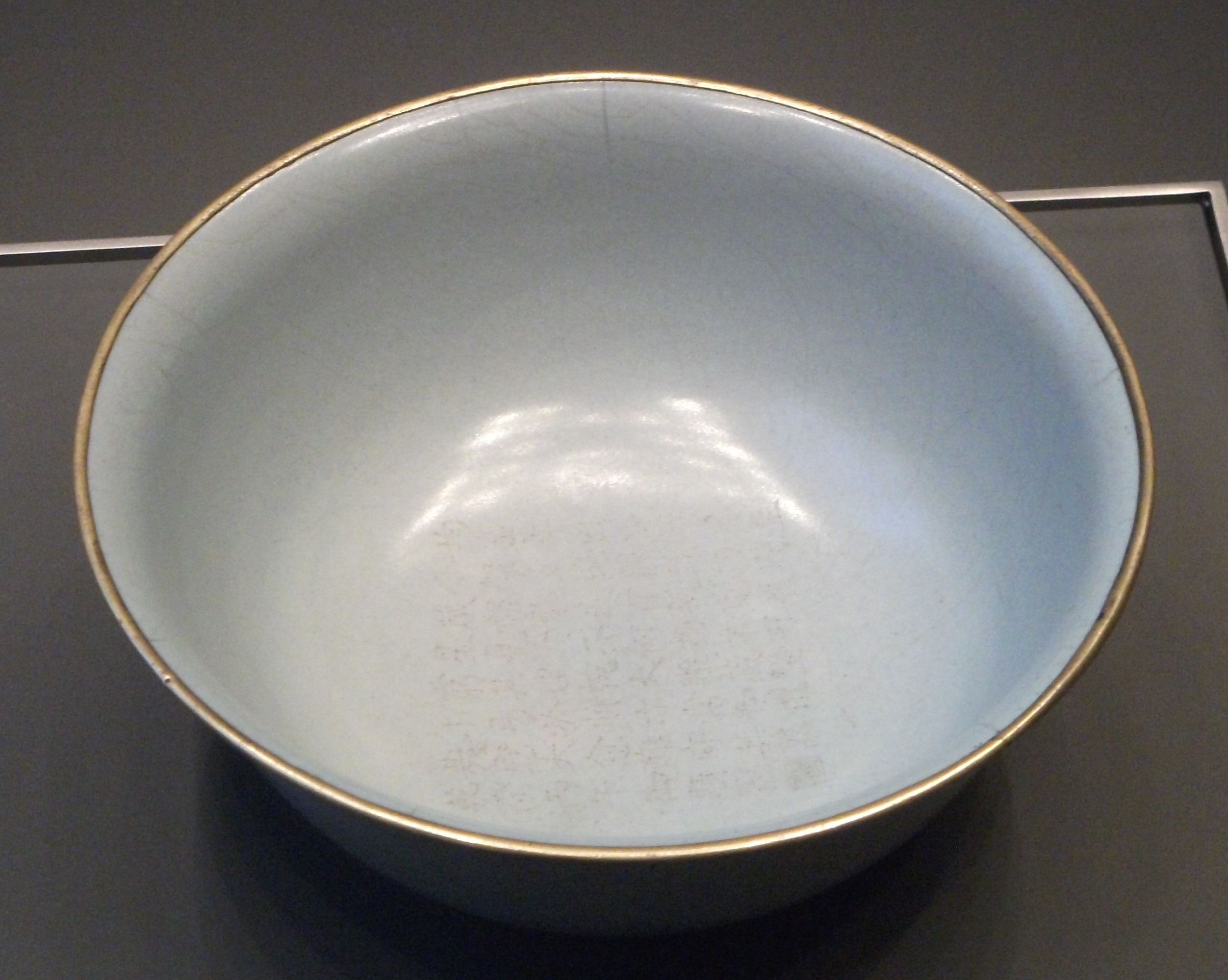
Ru ware bowl, with metal rim, 1086–1125

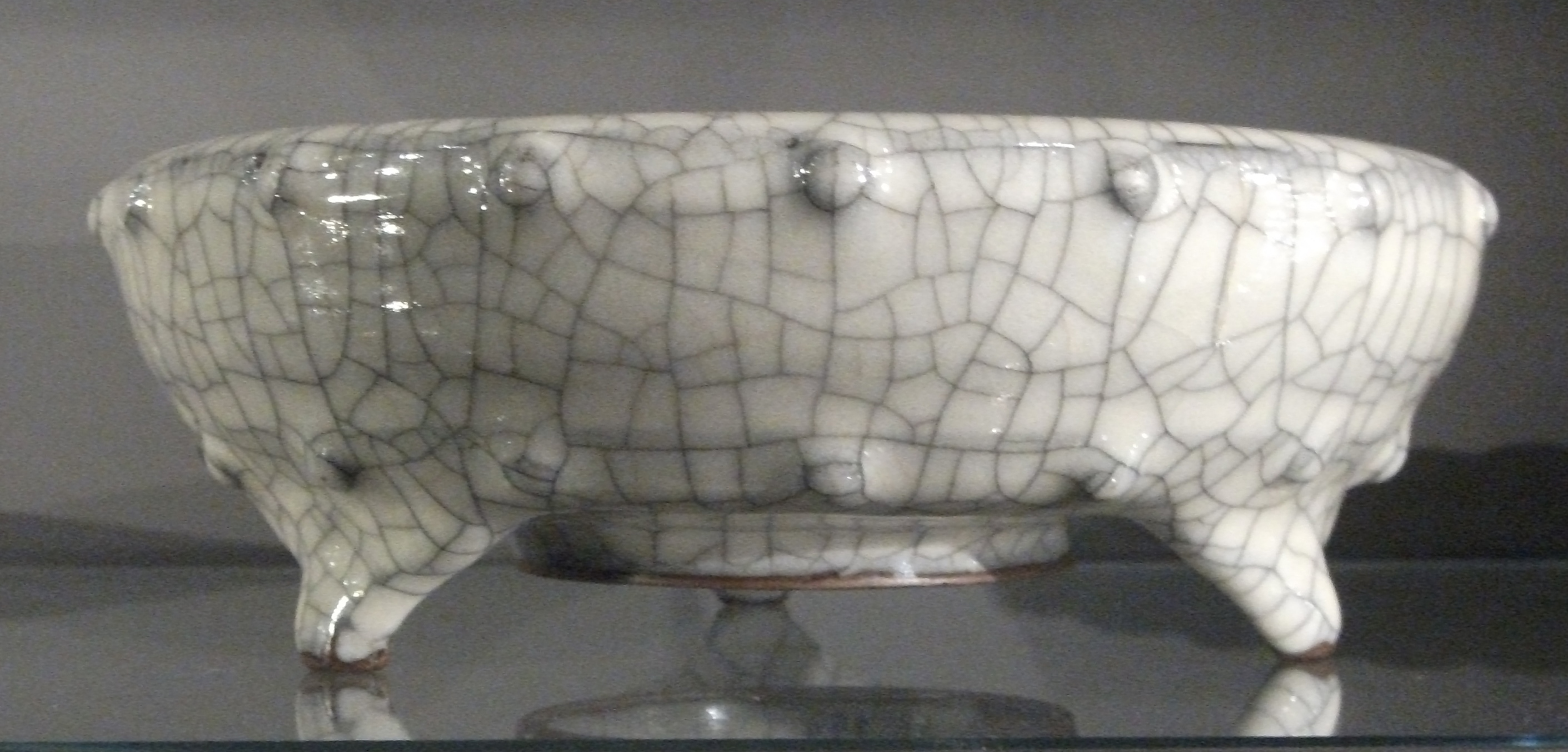
Small Guan ware bowl on legs (some 3 inches across), with pronounced glaze crackle, Southern Song

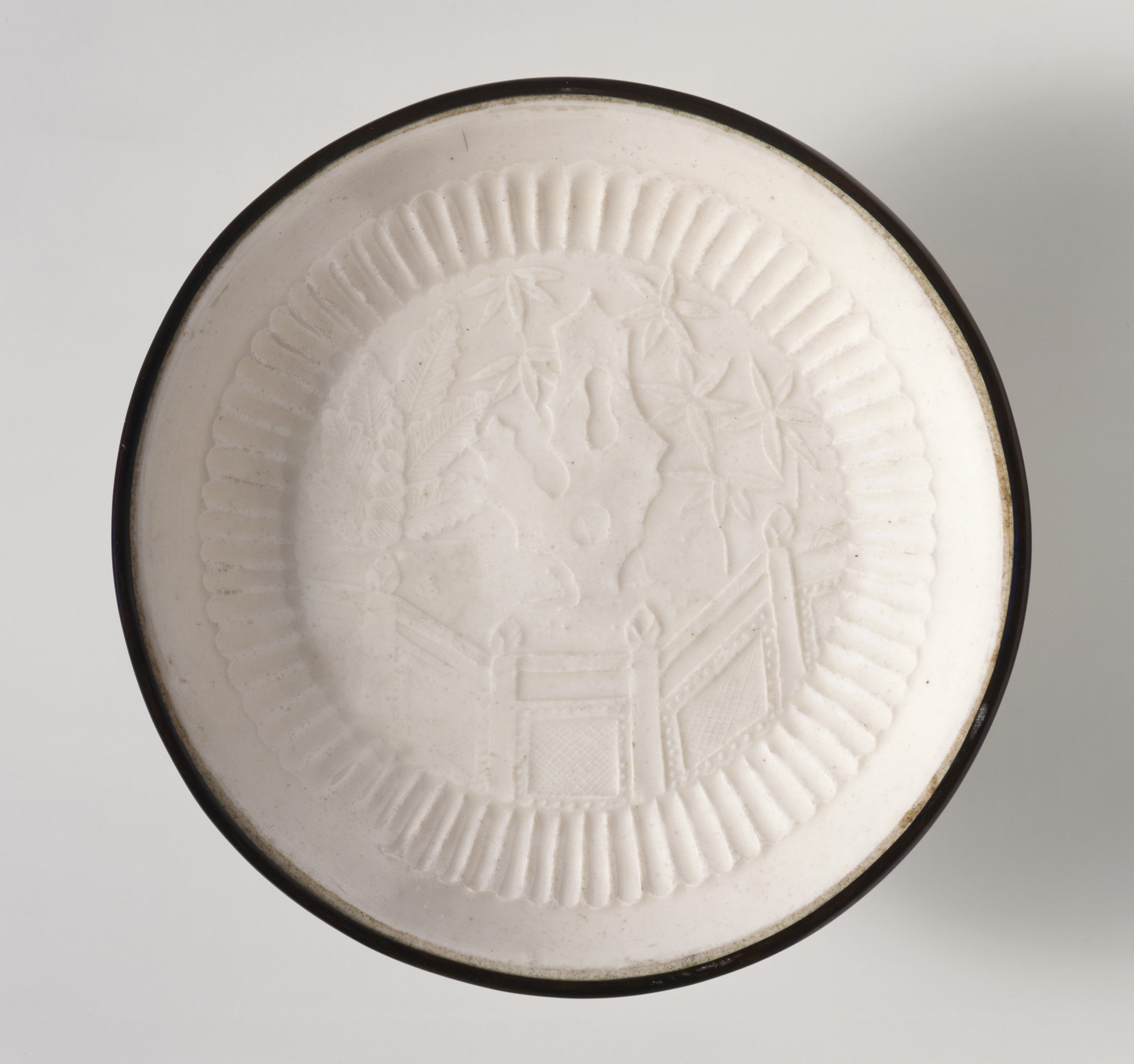
Ding ware dish with garden landscape, "molded stoneware with impressed decoration, transparent glaze, and banded metal rim", 13th century, diameter 5.5 in. (14 cm)

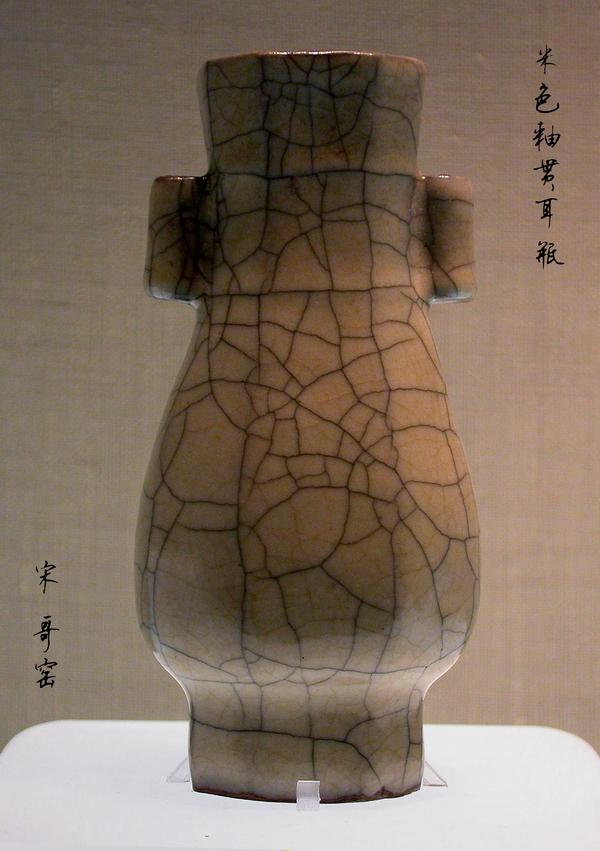
"Ge-type" or ge ware vase, with double crackle, dated by the Palace Museum Beijing to the Song
