= Ge ware =

Type of greenware in Chinese pottery

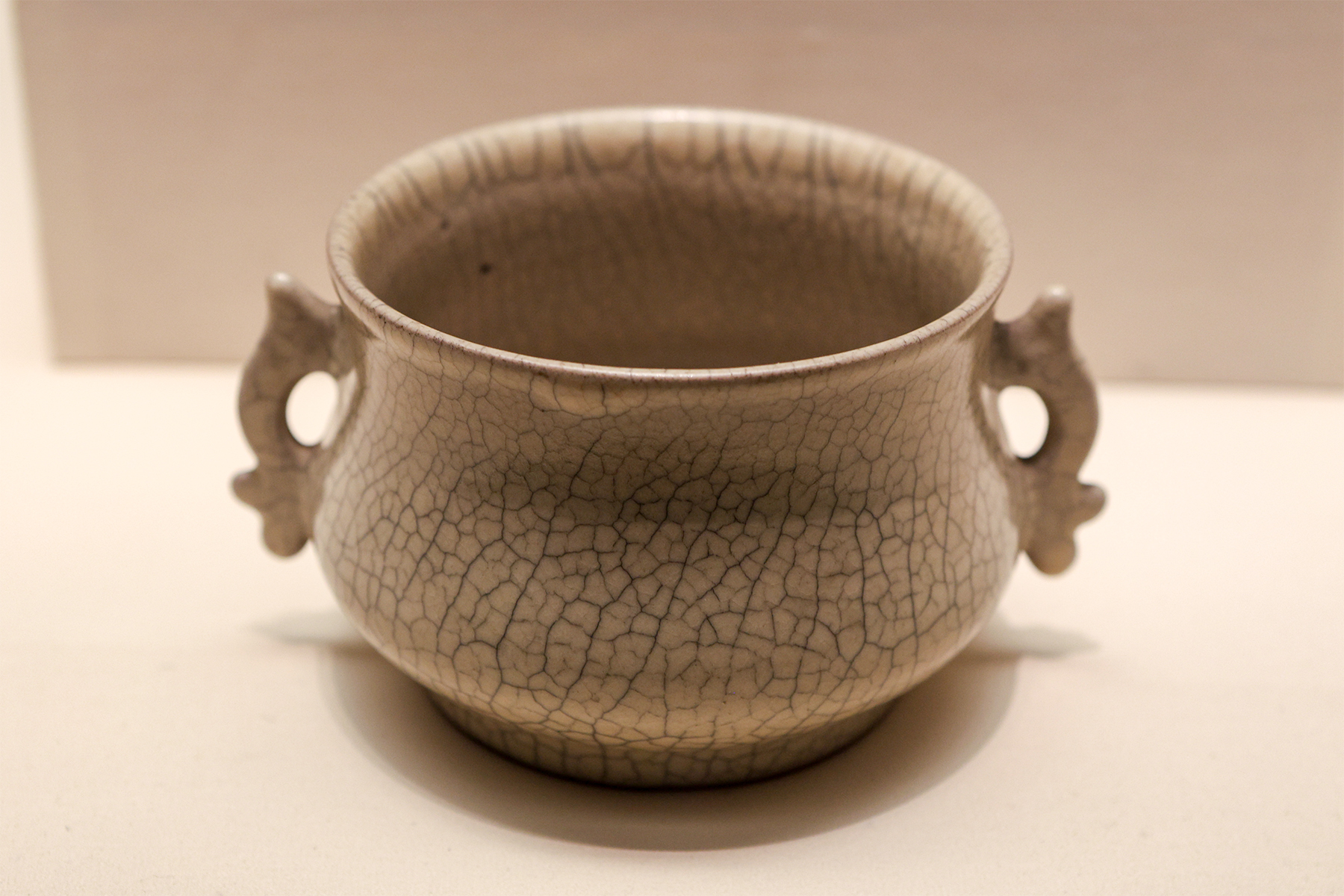
- Ge ware incense burner with fish-shaped handles, Palace Museum
- Branch: Chinese ceramics
- Years active: Song dynasty (12th–13th century); precise dating debated
- Location: Uncertain; traditionally attributed to Longquan, Zhejiang, China
- Influences: Guan ware, Longquan ware
- Influenced: Jingdezhen Ge-type wares (Ming–Qing dynasties)

Ge ware or Ko ware (Chinese: 哥窯; pinyin: Gē yáo; Wade–Giles: Ko-yao) is a type of celadon or greenware in Chinese pottery. It was one of the Five Great Kilns of the Song dynasty recognised by later Chinese writers, but has remained rather mysterious to modern scholars, with much debate as to which surviving pieces, if any, actually are Ge ware, whether they actually come from the Song, and where they were made. In recognition of this, many sources call all actual pieces Ge-type ware.

It is clear that their distinguishing feature is deliberate crackle, or a network of cracks in the glaze; but this is not restricted to them, and in particular the related Guan ware uses very similar effects. Ge ware often shows "double crackle" or crackle of two types, and one view is that this is the defining characteristic of the type. A three-day conference at the Shanghai Museum in 1992 attempted to reach a clear definition of Ge ware, but could not reconcile all views.

== History ==
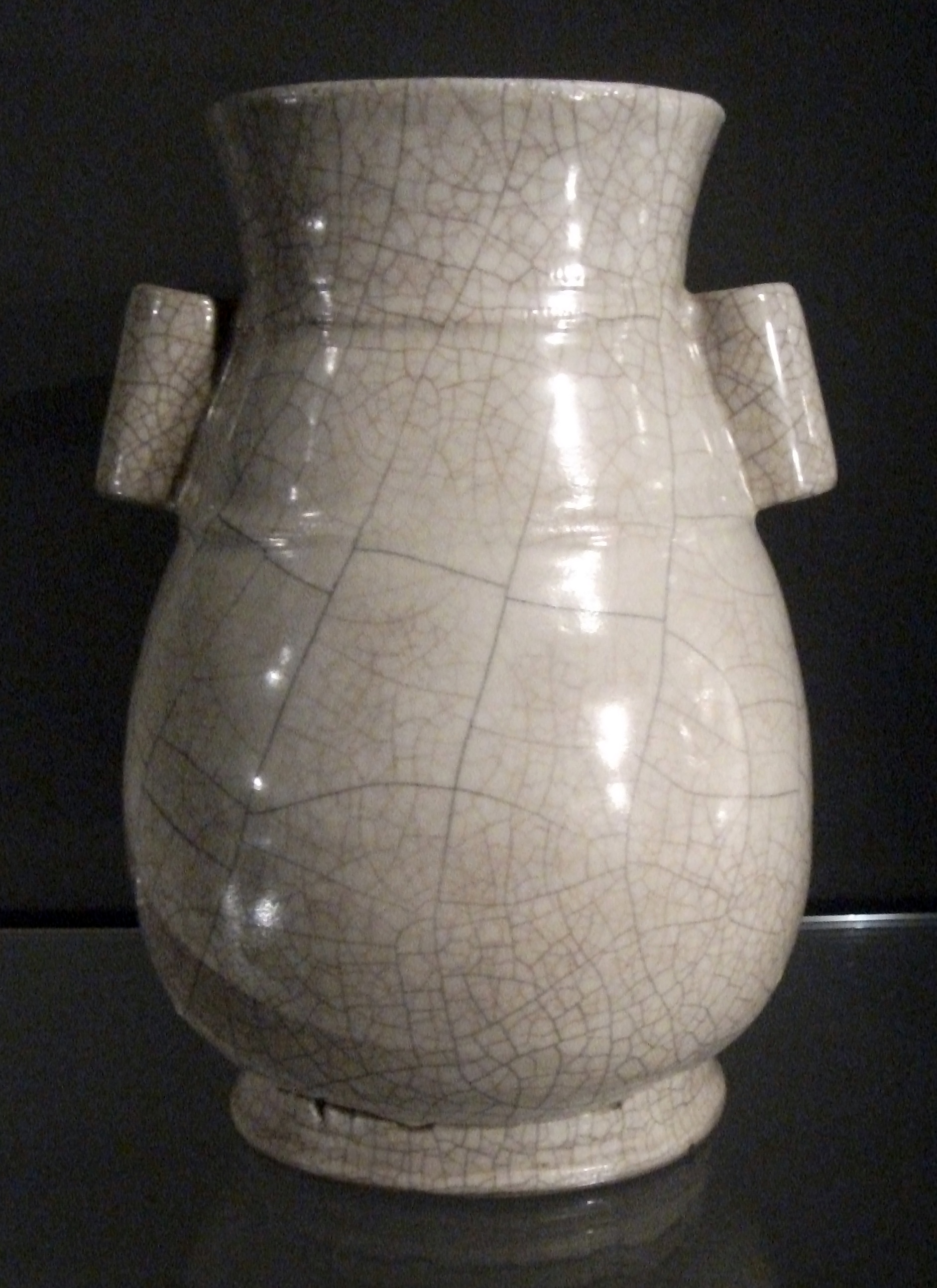
Ge-type vase, with "gold thread and iron wire" double crackle

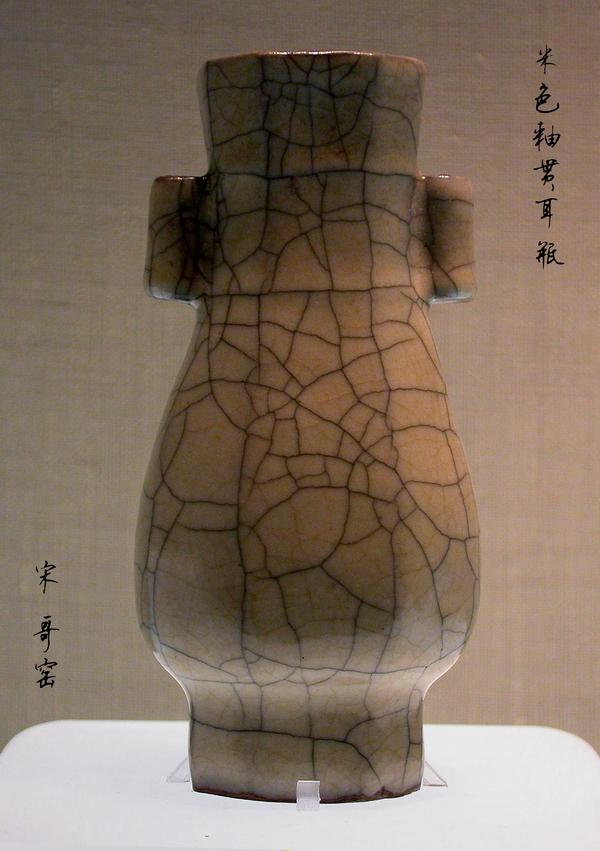
Ge-type vase, with "gold thread and iron wire" double crackle, Song dynasty, Palace Museum

"Ge" (Chinese: 哥) means "older brother" and the ware apparently takes its name from one of two potter Zhang brothers, from a story repeated in many sources from the Yuan onwards, with uncertain significance. They were both Longquan potters, perhaps in the Southern Song, though this is unclear. The elder brother developed a very special type of ware; the later sources say this was distinguished by crackled glaze, and Ge ware is supposed to be this type. The younger brother also developed a fine style of pottery, which is often taken to be the best quality early Longquan celadon.

Apparent pieces of Ge ware have been found in Yuan tombs, but not those from the Song, and increasingly the wares are regarded as a Yuan revival or replacement for Guan ware. Unlike Guan ware, it does not seem to have been produced for the court. There is a record of an incense-burner described as new being bought in 1355, close to the end of the Yuan, which compares it favourably to the "old" Guan ware. Production may well have continued into the early Ming dynasty.

The term may have become used very loosely by the Ming period, for all southern celadons with a pronounced crackle, and such usage continued in the West, though in recent decades it is discouraged.

== Characteristics ==
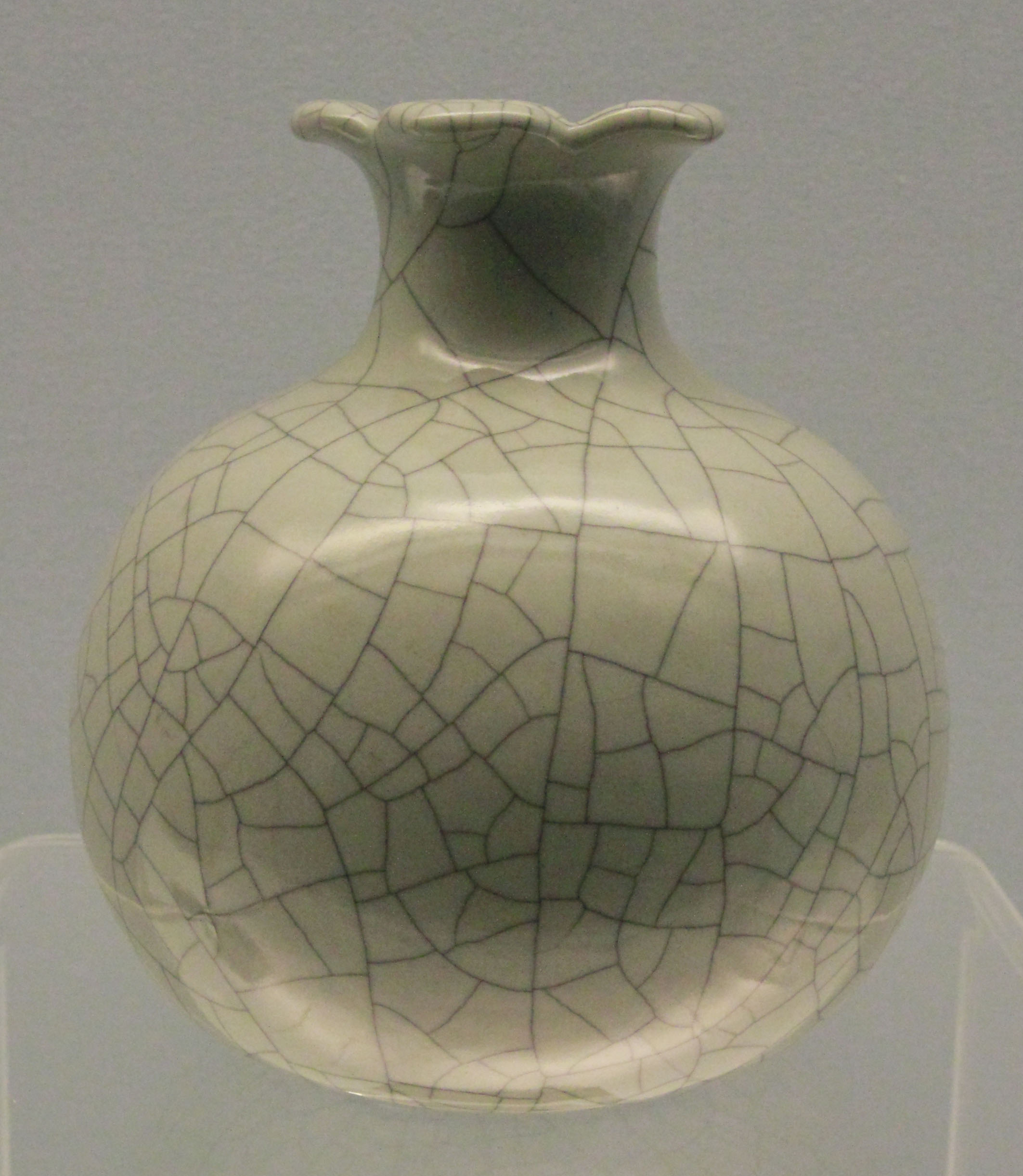
18th-century imitation of Ge ware in Jingdezhen porcelain, with single crackle pattern

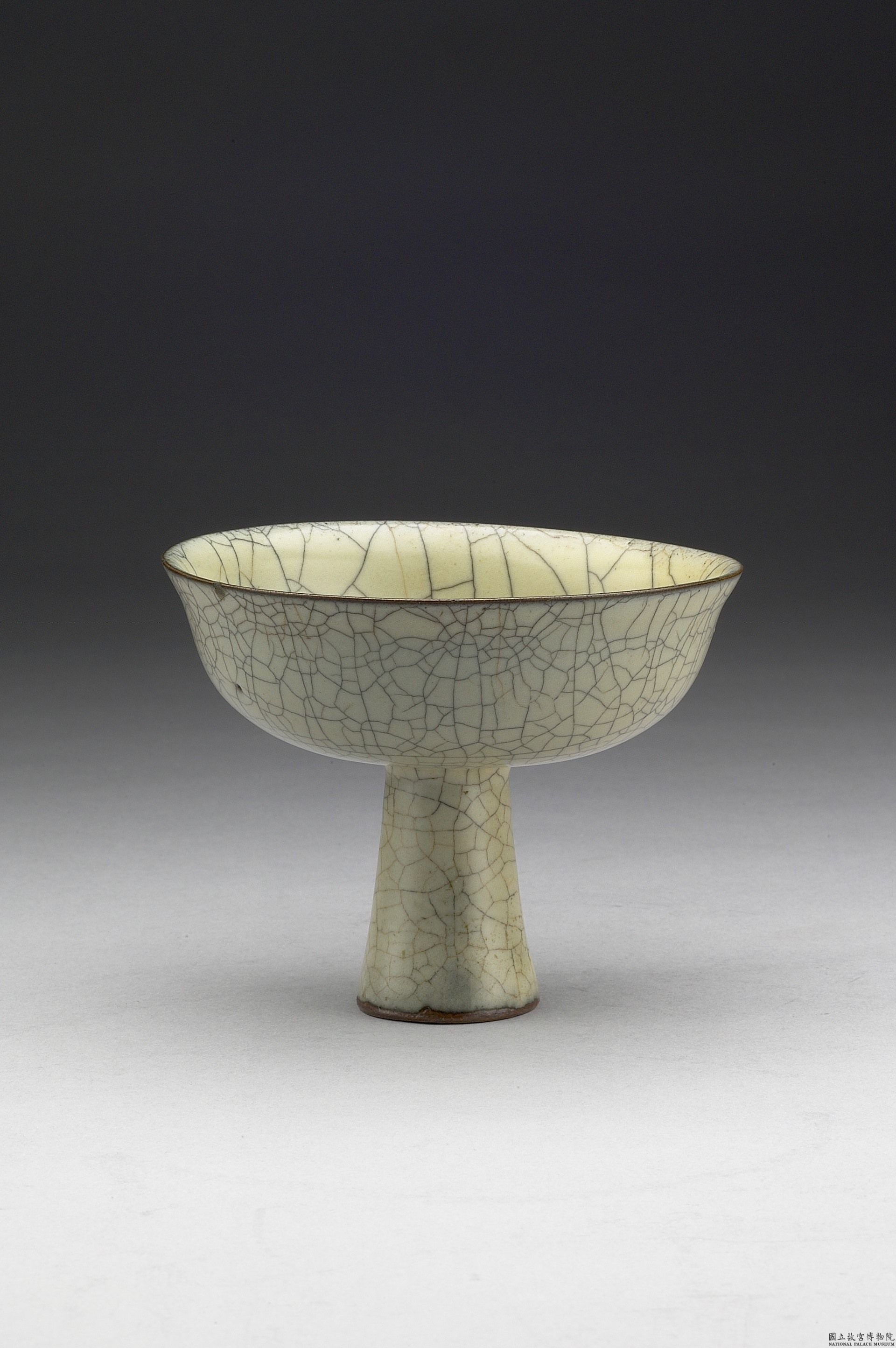
Stem bowl, Yuan dynasty, 14th century, National Palace Museum

The wares are closely related to Guan ware, also notable for crackle effects, and also Longquan celadon. Even more than in Guan ware, the glaze colour is a cream or ivory tending to grey or brown, with little green in it, although the wares come under the broad celadon grouping. The body is dark, and fired to stoneware in Western terms, and there are references in the traditional literature to the "purple mouth and iron[-coloured] foot" (紫口铁足; 紫口鐵足; zǐkǒu-tiězú), meaning the body is visible at the rim, where the glaze is thinner, and at the unglazed foot of vessels. The crackle arises during cooling, when the coefficient of expansion differs between the glaze and the body, the former contracting faster.

A vase in the Percival David Foundation, now on loan to the British Museum, had a poem written on it by the Qianlong Emperor in 1785; in two senses, as he had the poem inscribed inside the neck of the vase:

Despite the pattern of hundreds of intermingling crackle lines, its texture is fine and smooth to the touch. This is the work of the talented Elder brother. One discovers that the value of these undecorated wares is the same as that of unpolished gems. How could one compare this and the more elaborate products of Xuan(de) and Cheng(hua)? Each has its own individual charm. Composed by the Qianlong emperor in the cyclical year yisi [AD 1785]

This vase, catalogued as PDF.94, has "double crackle", or two sizes of crackle glaze, one with wide and large crackle, the other with a finer network. Each set of cracks has had the effect heightened by applying a coloured stain, in different colours. There are multiple layers of glaze, and the wider crackle develops first, with the finer one developing inside those sections. The crackle may take some time to appear after firing, and is probably mainly caused by rapid cooling, and perhaps low silica in the glaze. A similar effect can be seen in the Beijing vase illustrated here. This form of double crackle is called "gold thread and iron wire" (金丝铁线; 金絲鐵線; jīnsī-tiěxiàn) in Chinese tradition, describing the small and larger networks respectively.

Like other Song wares, Ge ware was skillfully copied in Jingdezhen porcelain under the Ming and Qing dynasties, as well as the 20th century, sometimes with the foot stained dark to resemble the originals. In these later periods, Ge ware became fashionable for the scholar's table and flower vases. The crackle was compared from the Ming onwards to cracking ice, with its suggestion of spring arriving, and evoked a line in the classic Daoist text the Dao De Jing describing a sage as "shrinking, as when ice melts". A range of fanciful names were devised by connoisseurs for different types of crackle: small "fish-egg pattern" (鱼子纹; 魚子紋; yúzǐwén, and "ox-hair" (牛毛纹; 牛毛紋; niúmáowén), willow-leaf (柳叶纹; 柳葉紋; liǔyèwén), and large "crab-claw" (蟹爪纹; 蟹爪紋; xièzhǎowén).
