= Guan ware =

Type of Chinese stoneware

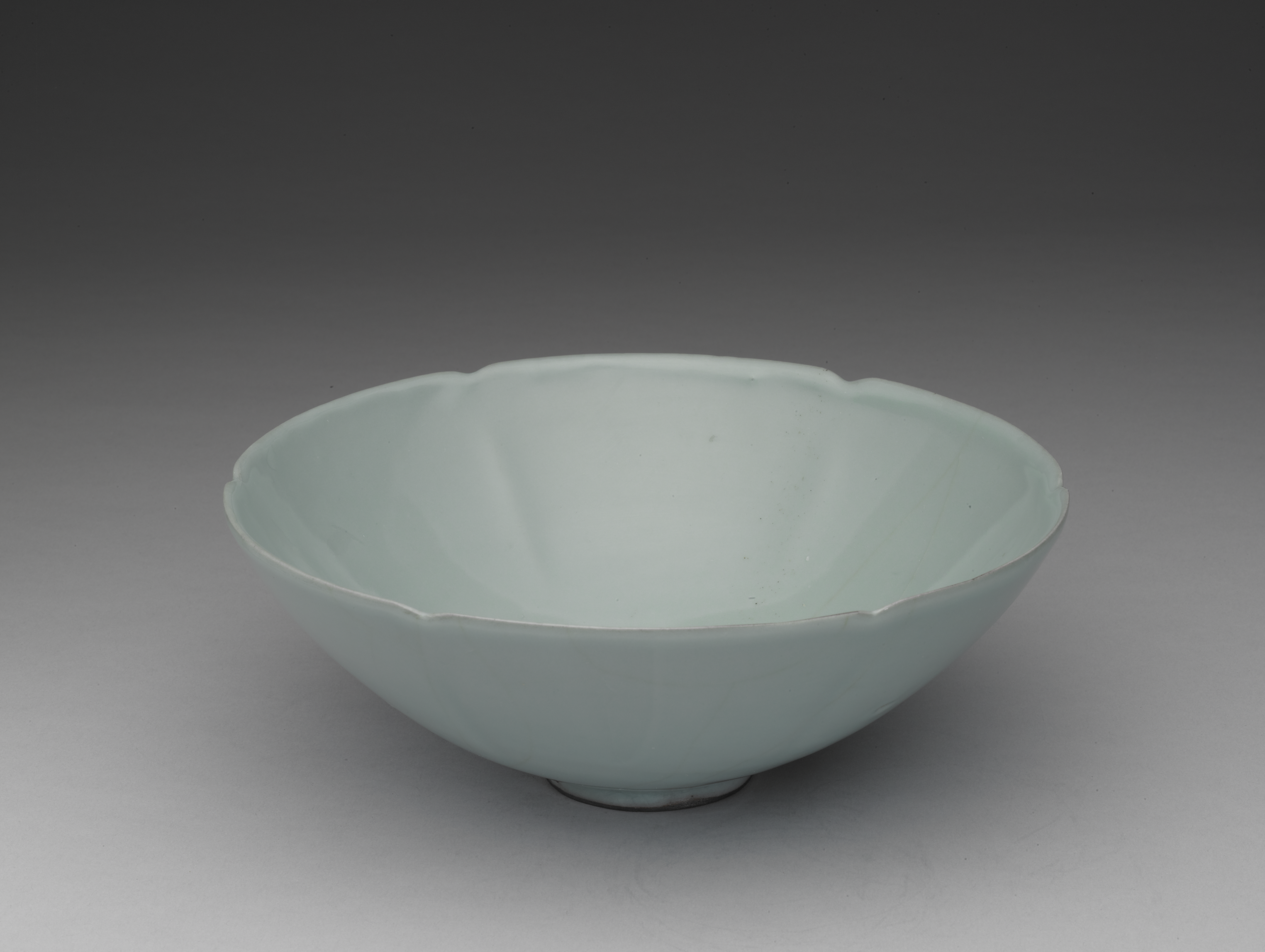
- Guan ware celadon bowl with hibiscus-shaped rim, Southern Song dynasty (1127–1279). National Palace Museum
- Branch: Chinese ceramics
- Years active: Northern Song (early 12th century) – Southern Song dynasty (12th–13th century)
- Location: Northern Song: Bianjing (Kaifeng), Henan (kiln site unconfirmed); Southern Song: Hangzhou, Zhejiang (Xiushisi and Jiaotanxia kiln sites)
- Influences: Ru ware

Guan ware or Kuan ware (Chinese: 官窯; pinyin: guān yáo; Wade–Giles: kuan-yao) is one of the Five Famous Kilns of Song dynasty China, making high-status stonewares, whose surface decoration relied heavily on crackled glaze, randomly crazed by a network of crack lines in the glaze.

Guan means "official" in Chinese and Guan ware was, most unusually for Chinese ceramics of the period, the result of an imperial initiative resulting from the loss of access to northern kilns such as those making Ru ware and Jun ware after the invasion of the north and the flight of a Song prince to establish the Southern Song at a new capital at Hangzhou, Zhejiang province. It is usually assumed that potters from the northern imperial kilns followed the court south to man the new kilns.

In some Asian sources "Guan ware" may be used in the literally translated sense to cover any "official" wares ordered by the Imperial court. In April 2015, Liu Yiqian paid US$14.7 million for a Guan ware vase from the Southern Song.

== Dating and kiln sites ==
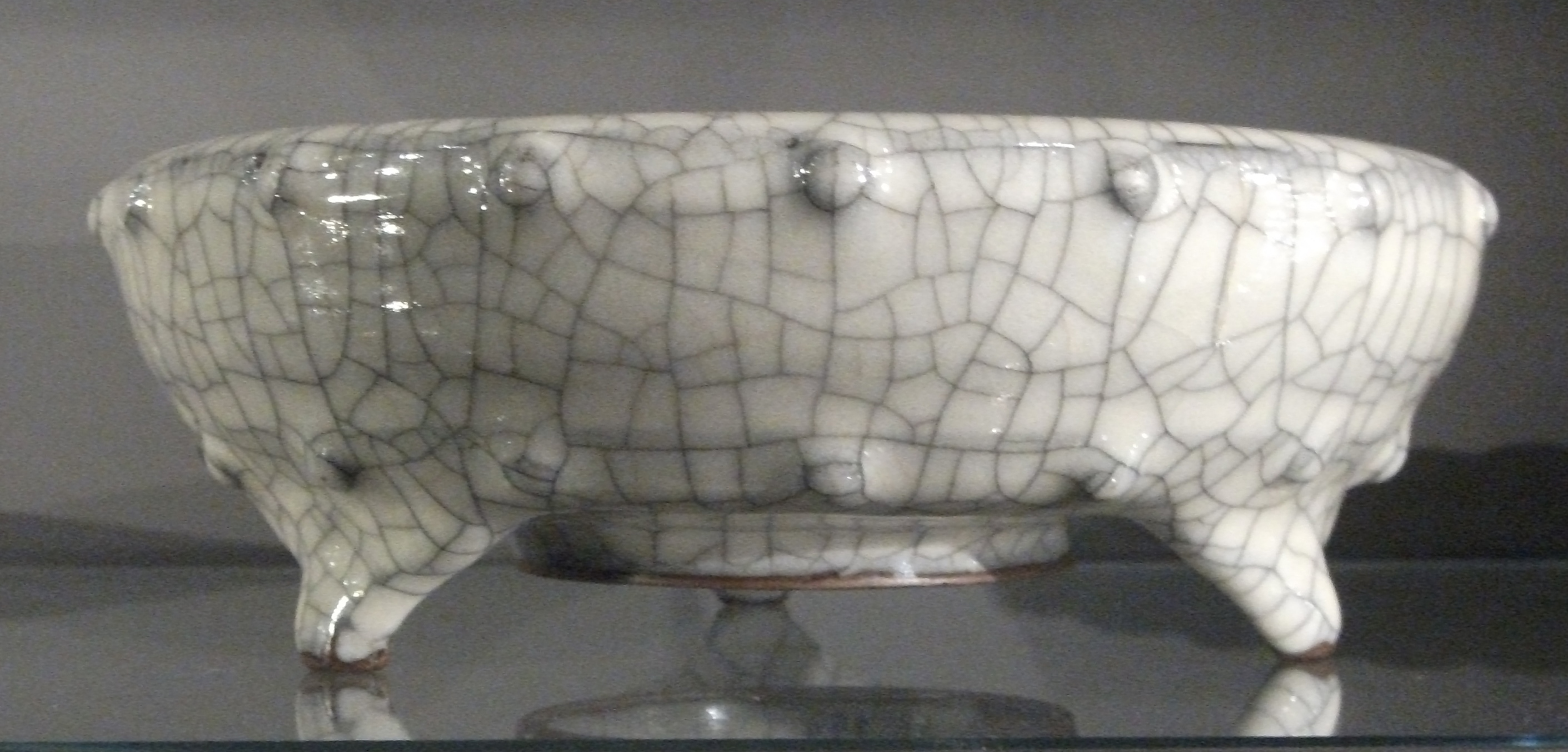
Small Guan bowl on legs (some 3 inches across), with pronounced type 3 glaze crackle

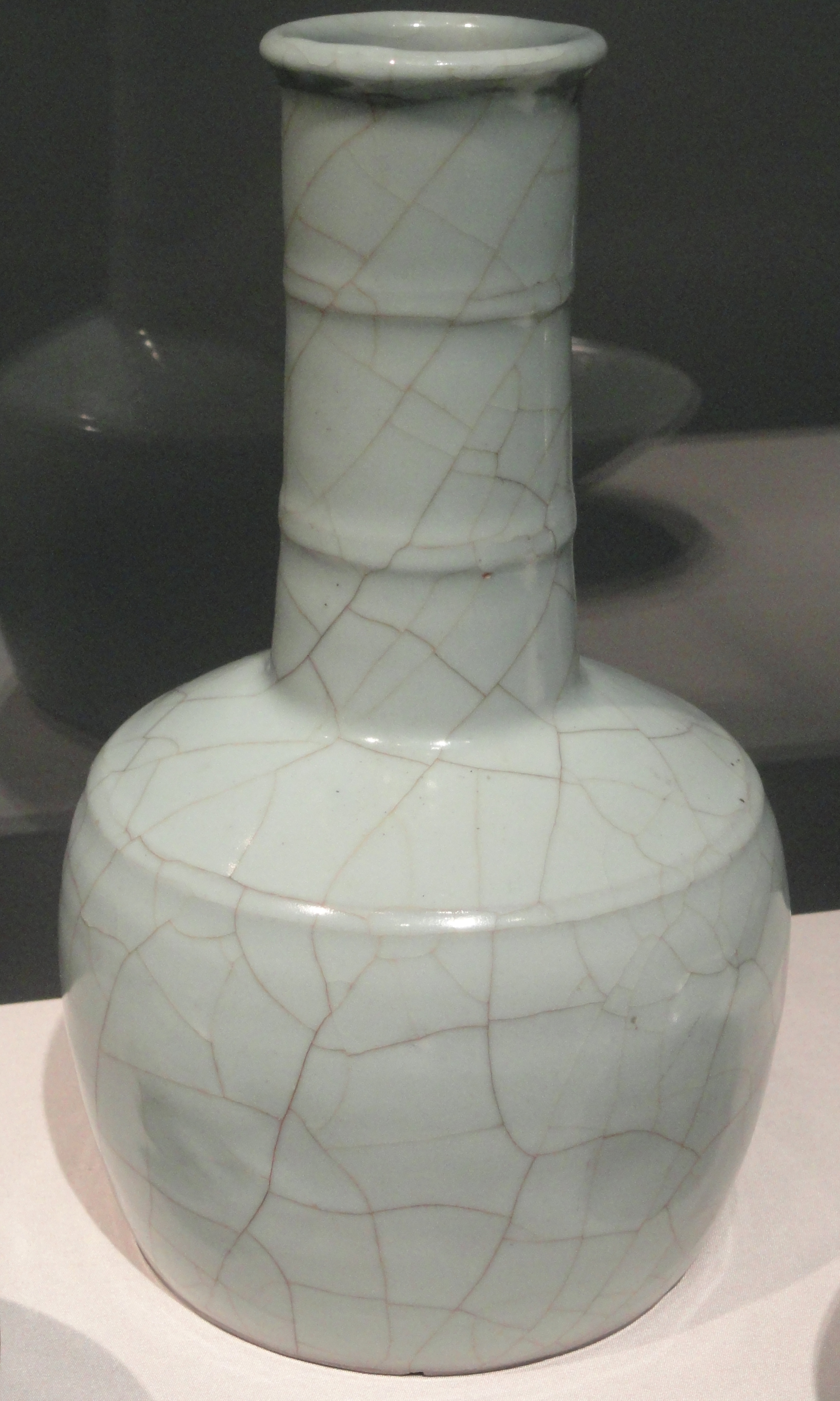
Mallet-shaped vase, Guan ware, 12th–13th century, with type 1 crackle

The new Southern Song court was established in Hangzhou in 1127, but some time probably elapsed before the kiln was established; this may not have been until after hostilities with the invaders were concluded in 1141. According to Chinese historical sources, the first kiln was actually within or beside the palace precinct, described as in the "back park", and was called or was at "Xiuneisi". Various places around the city have been explored, and ceramic remains found, but perhaps because of subsequent building on the site, the location of this kiln remained uncertain, and it is now thought that the name might refer to the controlling office rather than the actual kiln site. Following excavations in starting in 1996 it is now thought that the site has been found, as the Laohudong or Tiger Cave Kiln (老虎洞窑) on the outskirts of the city. An old Yue ware dragon kiln had been revived, but the official wares were made in a northern-style mantou kiln, rare this far south.

A second kiln was established later at Jiaotanxia ("Altar of Heaven" or "Suburban Altar"), on the outskirts of the new capital; this has been identified and excavated. In Chinese contemporary sources these wares were regarded as rather inferior to those from the first kiln, and the excavated sherds are very similar to those of the nearby Longquan celadon kilns. Indeed, Longquan may have helped out when the Guan kilns could not fulfill orders by themselves.

The end date of Guan ware is uncertain, but it probably persisted until 1400 or later, as the Ge Gu Yao Lun, a fourteenth century Ming dynasty manual on ceramics by Cao Zhao, seems to treat it as being still produced.

== Characteristics ==
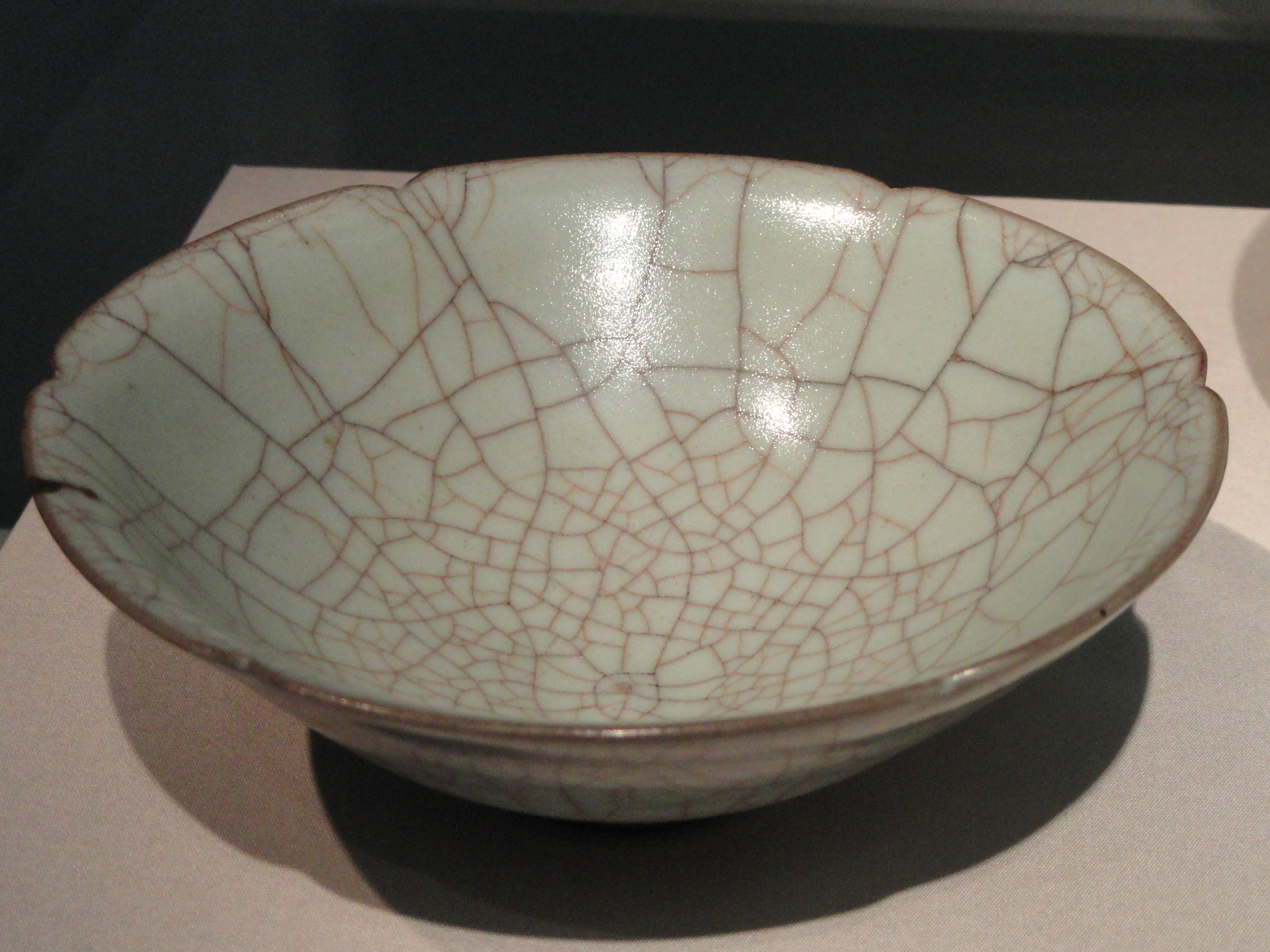
Bowl with type 2 crackle and lobed rim

Guan ware is not difficult to distinguish from the Ru ware which it perhaps tries to imitate, but wares from the second site can be very similar indeed to Longquan ware, and it has been suggested that some was made there. Crackled glaze is usual, but perhaps was not at this time a desired effect, as it certainly became in imitations centuries later. Alternatively it was originally produced accidentally, but within the Guan period became deliberate. In surviving examples the effect is probably often more striking than it would have been originally, either because collectors have chemically enhanced them, through gradual oxidation over time, or from staining in use.

Three qualities of the ware are recorded in old sources, and can be identified in surviving examples. The best had a grey-blue glaze on a thin body, with wide crackle, followed by a greener glaze with a denser crackle, then finally "almost a pale grey brown" with a "very dark close crackle on a dark grey body" that was rather thicker; all are illustrated here, with the types indicated by 1–3 (which is not a standard terminology).

The crackle arises during cooling, when the coefficient of expansion differs between the glaze and the body. There are several layers of glaze, and the glaze is often thicker than the clay body, as can be seen in sherds. The crackle does not occur through all layers. Most shapes were wheel thrown, but moulds and slab-building were also used. Less usual shapes include those derived from ancient ritual bronzes and jade congs. Bowls and dishes often have "lobed or indented rims".

== Imitations ==
Guan ware is "the most frequently copied of all Chinese wares", and the imitations began immediately, at the many southern kilns producing Longquan celadon and other wares. Imitations in Jingdezhen porcelain seem to have begun under the Yuan dynasty and continue to the present day; these are often hard to date.
