= Percival David Foundation of Chinese Art =

Chinese ceramics and related items at the British Museum and SOAS

Coordinates: 51°31′29″N 0°7′49″W

External videos
- The David Vases, Smarthistory

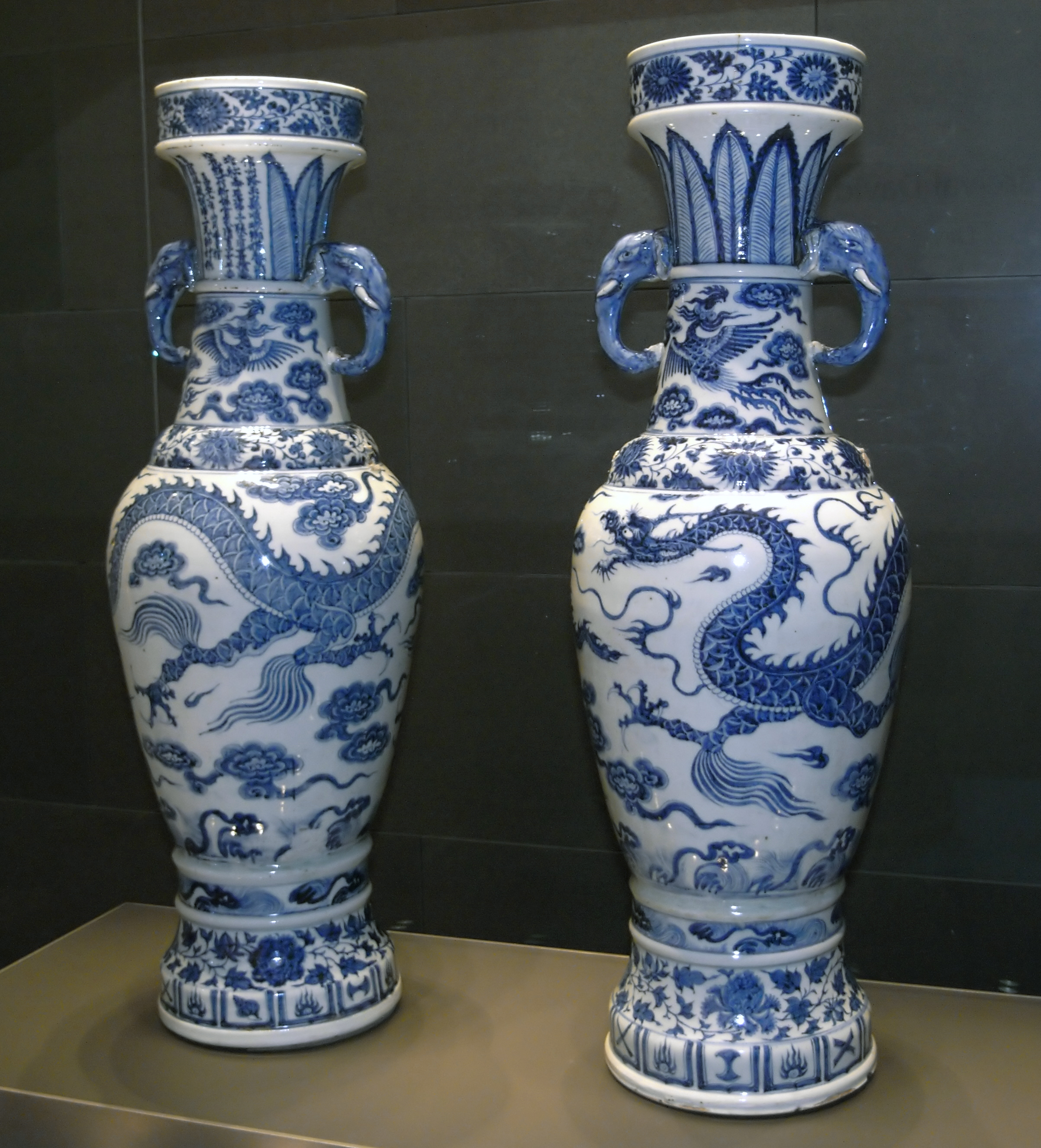
The David Vases, said to be two of the best-known Chinese porcelains in the world

The Percival David Foundation of Chinese Art (abbreviated as the PDF) held a collection of Chinese ceramics and related items assembled by Percival David that are on permanent display in a dedicated gallery in Room 95 at the British Museum. The foundation's main purpose is to promote the study and teaching of Chinese art and culture. The collection, now owned by the British Museum, has some 1,700 pieces, mostly of Song, Yuan, Ming and Qing dynasty porcelain from the 10th century to the 18th. It includes a painting, Scroll of Antiquities (古玩圖 Guwan tu, 1728, Yongzheng's reign).

The collection concentrates on pieces in the "Chinese taste" rather than export ware, and on Imperial porcelain, much of it Jingdezhen ware. It includes examples of the rare Ru and Guan wares and two important Yuan dynasty blue and white porcelain temple vases (the "David Vases"), the oldest dated blue and white porcelain pieces, from 1351. The Foundation also has a large library of Western and East Asian books related to Chinese art; this and archival material are housed in the library of School of Oriental and African Studies (SOAS), University of London.

In 1950, the collection was presented to the University of London by Sir Percival David. It was displayed in a house at 53 Gordon Square and used as a focus for the teaching of Chinese art and culture at SOAS. The collection has been on display in a special room at the British Museum since 2009. In November 2024, it was announced that the collection would be donated to the British Museum by the trustees of the Sir Percival David Foundation. With an estimated value of £1bn, this is to date the most valuable donation in the museum's history. The donation was approved by the Charity Commission in March 2025 and the collection was officially transferred to the British Museum on 2 April 2025.

== History ==
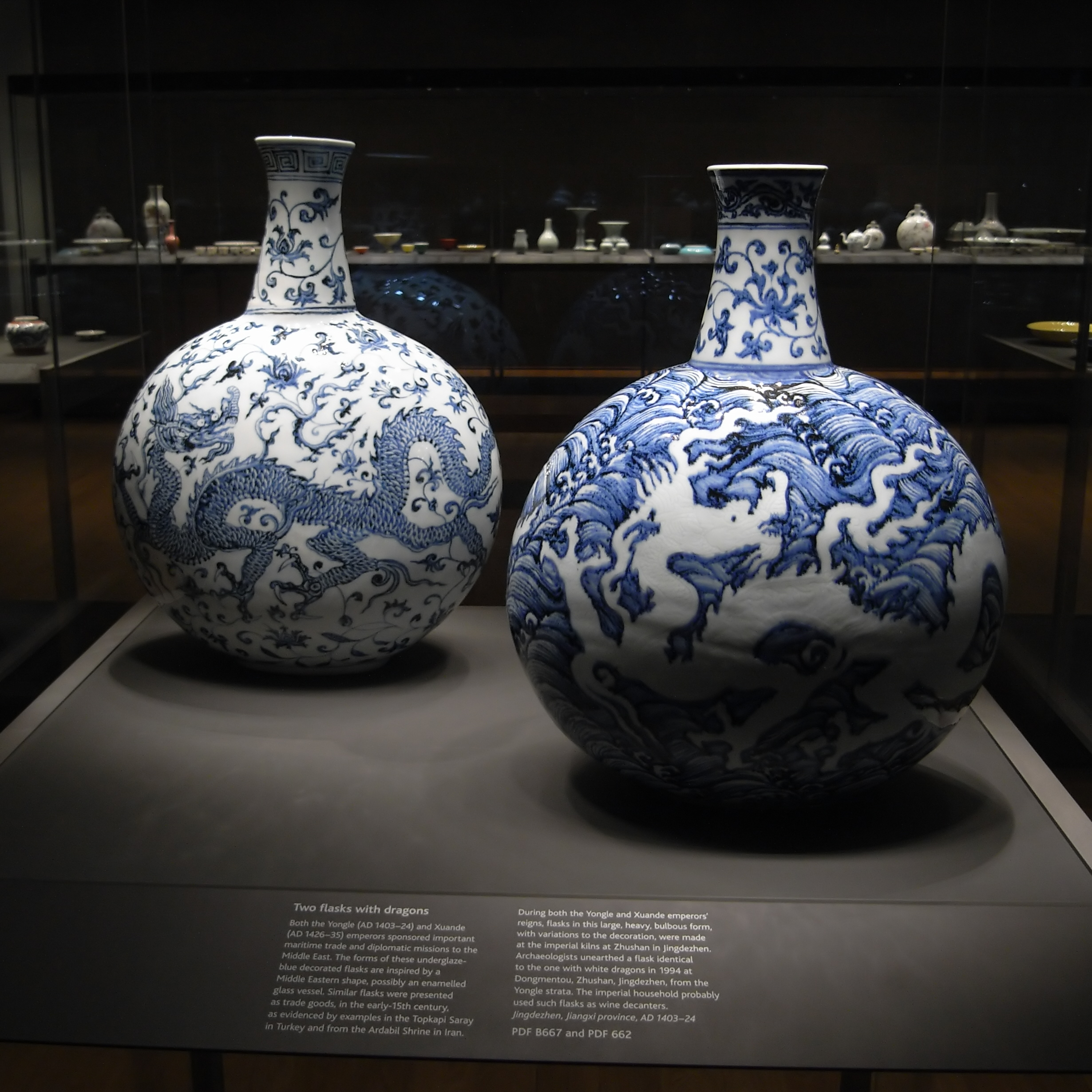
Two flasks with dragons, 1403–24

Percival David started collecting Chinese art some time around 1913, and he continued to do so until his death in 1964. He first visited China in 1923, and there he gained an appreciation of Chinese ceramics. In 1925 he helped finance and mount an exhibition of many of the best items of the imperial collection in the Forbidden City in Beijing. In 1927, he acquired some items that were originally from the Forbidden City when they came onto the market. Many of these items were sold off by members of the Imperial Household Department during the late Qing dynasty, and Empress Dowager Cixi allegedly used these items as collateral for loans from the Yuin Yeh Bank in 1901. David managed to buy some forty pieces one way or the other and export them to the United Kingdom. In 1930, he again returned to China and helped with various exhibitions and produced a series of catalogues of the pieces. However, much of the acquisition history of David's collection was unrecorded, but he may have acquired many of the items through various dealers, auctions and other collectors. The Yuan dynasty 'David Vases' in the collection were acquired from two separate sources. Many pieces were likely once owned by the Qing dynasty emperors, and several pieces have inscriptions added on the orders of the Qianlong Emperor (1736–95). The pieces assembled by Percival David form the most important single collection of Chinese ceramics outside of China and Taiwan.

In 1931, David's collection was displayed in the Dorchester Hotel in London. It remained there until it was evacuated to the countryside during World War II. David also created a Chair in Chinese Art and Architecture at the Courtauld Institute of Art, which is part of the University of London. Towards the end of his life, he was determined to keep the collection together, and to this end entered negotiations with the University of London. An agreement was reached to keep the collection and the library together in a foundation attached to SOAS.

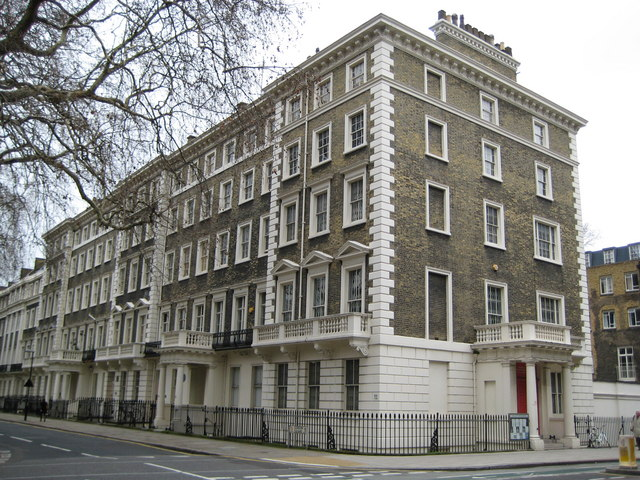
The former home of the Percival David Foundation in Gordon Square

The chair that David had created was also moved to SOAS. Previous holders of the chair, called the Percival David Professor of Chinese and East Asian Art, include William Watson, Roderick Whitfield and Craig Clunas. The incumbent in 2015 was Shane McCausland. The collection was opened to the public on 10 June 1952 in a house at 53 Gordon Square, Bloomsbury.

The foundation has lent many of its pieces to other countries. It lent many items of Yuan dynasty porcelain to Venice's 700th-anniversary celebration of Marco Polo's expedition. It has also sent other items to places as far away as Japan and the United States.

The library collection was a working library, open to researchers from around the world, and is now accessible through SOAS.

== Relocation ==
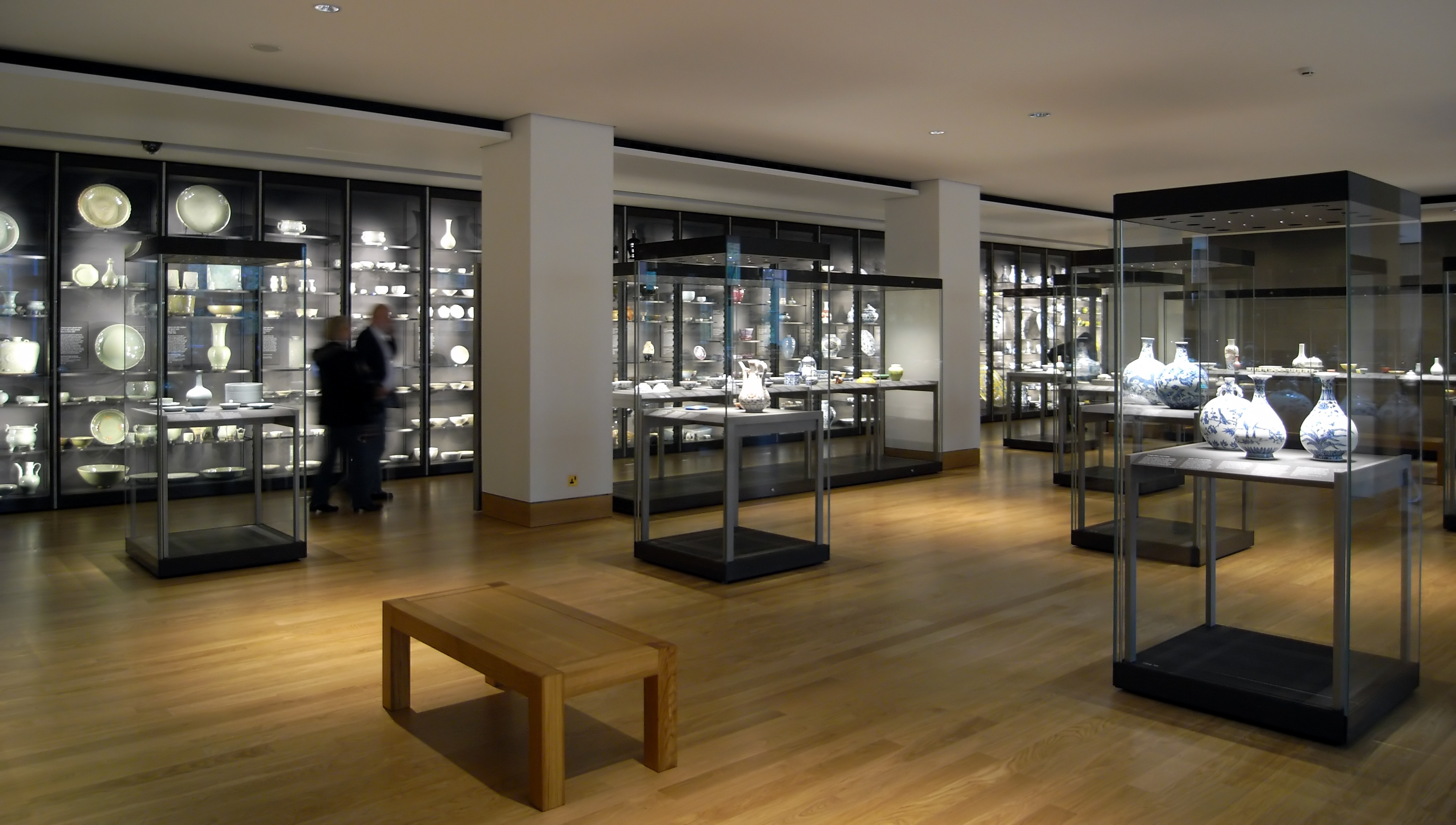
Room 95, British Museum

Due to a funding crisis, 53 Gordon Square closed at the end of 2007. The ceramics collection went on a long-term loan to the British Museum, where the whole collection, about 1,700 objects, is on permanent public display in a specially designed gallery (Room 95, British Museum) opened on 23 April 2009, sponsored by Sir Joseph Hotung. The public gallery is part of the Sir Joseph Hotung Centre for Ceramic Studies, which includes facilities to use the collection for teaching.

Chinese Ceramics: Highlights of the Sir Percival David Collection, by Regina Krahl and Jessica Harrison-Hall, was published in April 2009 by the British Museum Press to coincide with the opening of the new display.

In November 2024, it was announced that the collection of 1,700 objects, worth an estimated £1bn, would be donated to the British Museum. The donation formally took place in April 2025. Some items of the collection will be lent to the Shanghai Museum in China and Metropolitan Museum of Art in New York following the completion of the donation.

== Collection ==
David focused his collection of Chinese ceramics on stonewares and porcelain from the 10th to the 18th centuries (Song to Qing dynasties), with a few earlier pieces from the Six Dynasties to the Tang. The earliest piece in the collection dates from the third-century Western Jin. There are no pieces from the earlier periods of Chinese history because David chose not to collect any Chinese earthenware; the development of earthenware is found all around the world, and David's collection aims to give a representative overview of the development of ceramics that is unique to China. He chose the pieces based on the quality of the workmanship and historical importance with a view towards education.

Many pieces in the collection were imperial wares of the Ming and Qing dynasty, and David collected an unusual number of the rare Song dynasty Ru ware. Other notable items in the collection are the David Vases, and a chicken cup for serving wine during the reign of the Ming emperor Chenghua. Just before the opening of the collection in 1952, the foundation was also given a small collection of mostly monochrome porcelain belonging to Mountstuart Elphinstone.

At the British Museum, the collection of the 1,700 items starts with the David Vases placed before the main space of Room 95. Around two hundred of the best pieces are displayed in cases in the centre of the room, with the remaining 1,500 pieces arranged more compactly in rows of glass shelves around the room.

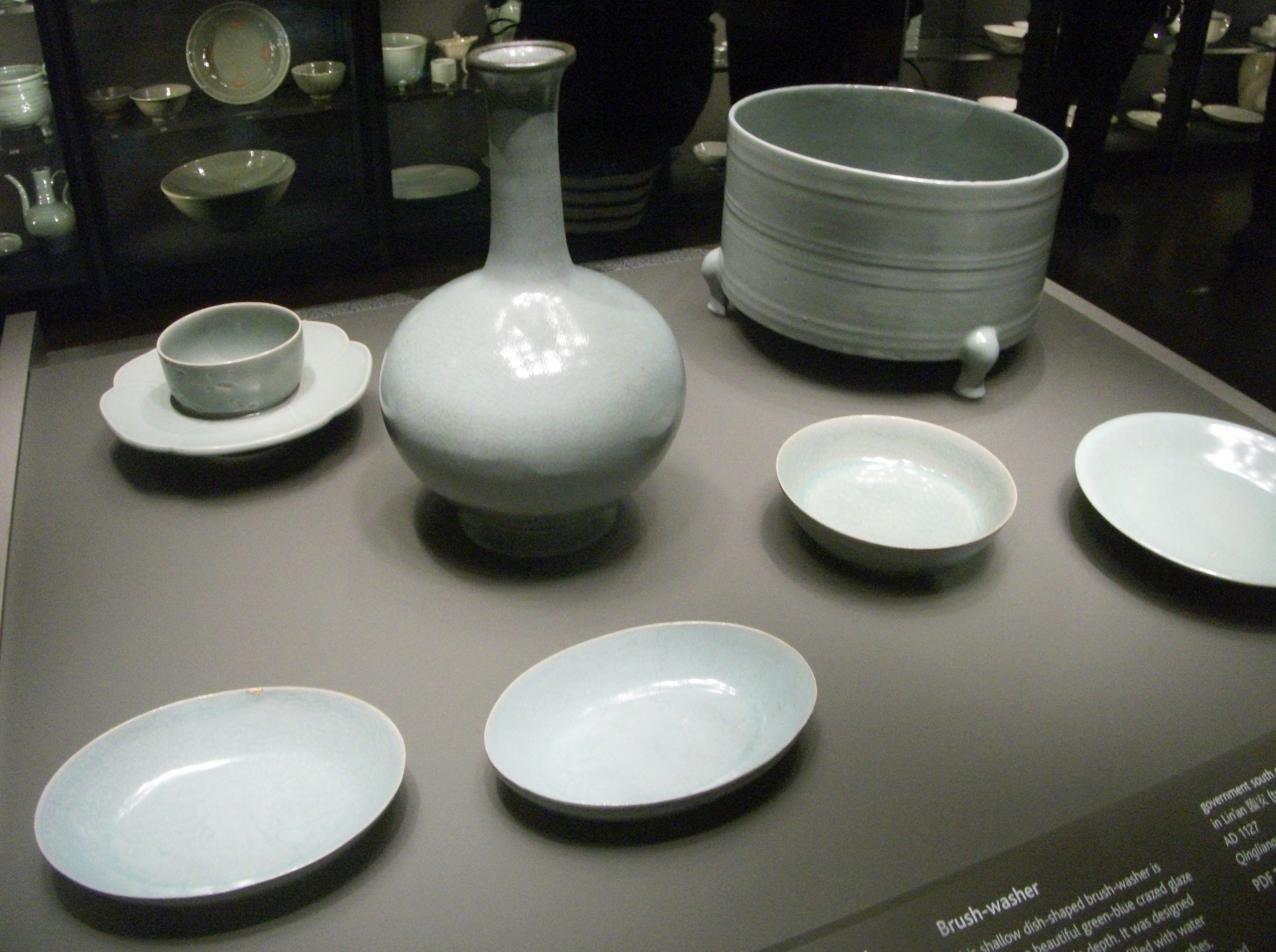
Case with over 5% of the world's surviving Ru ware, Song, c. 1100

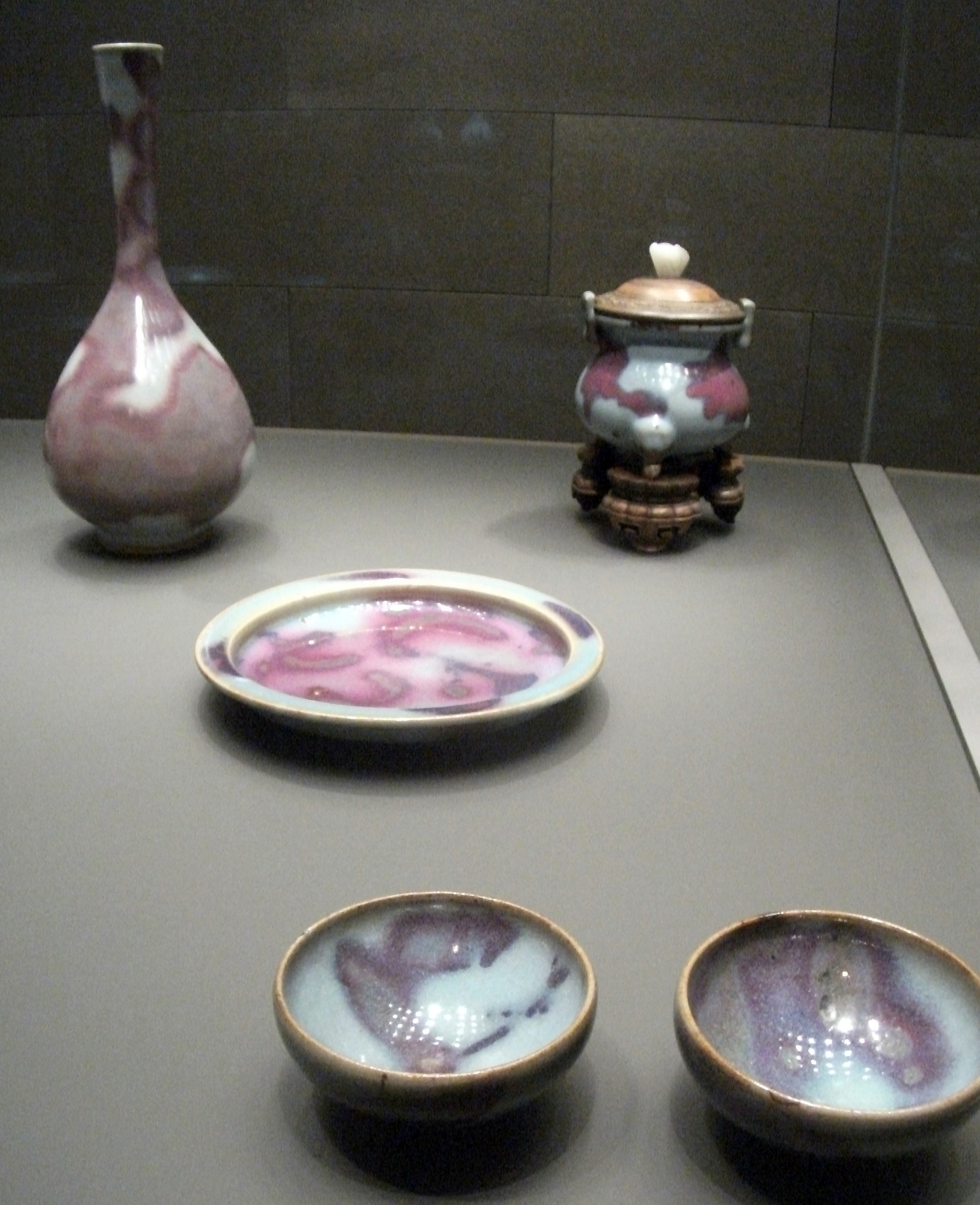
A selection of Jun wares

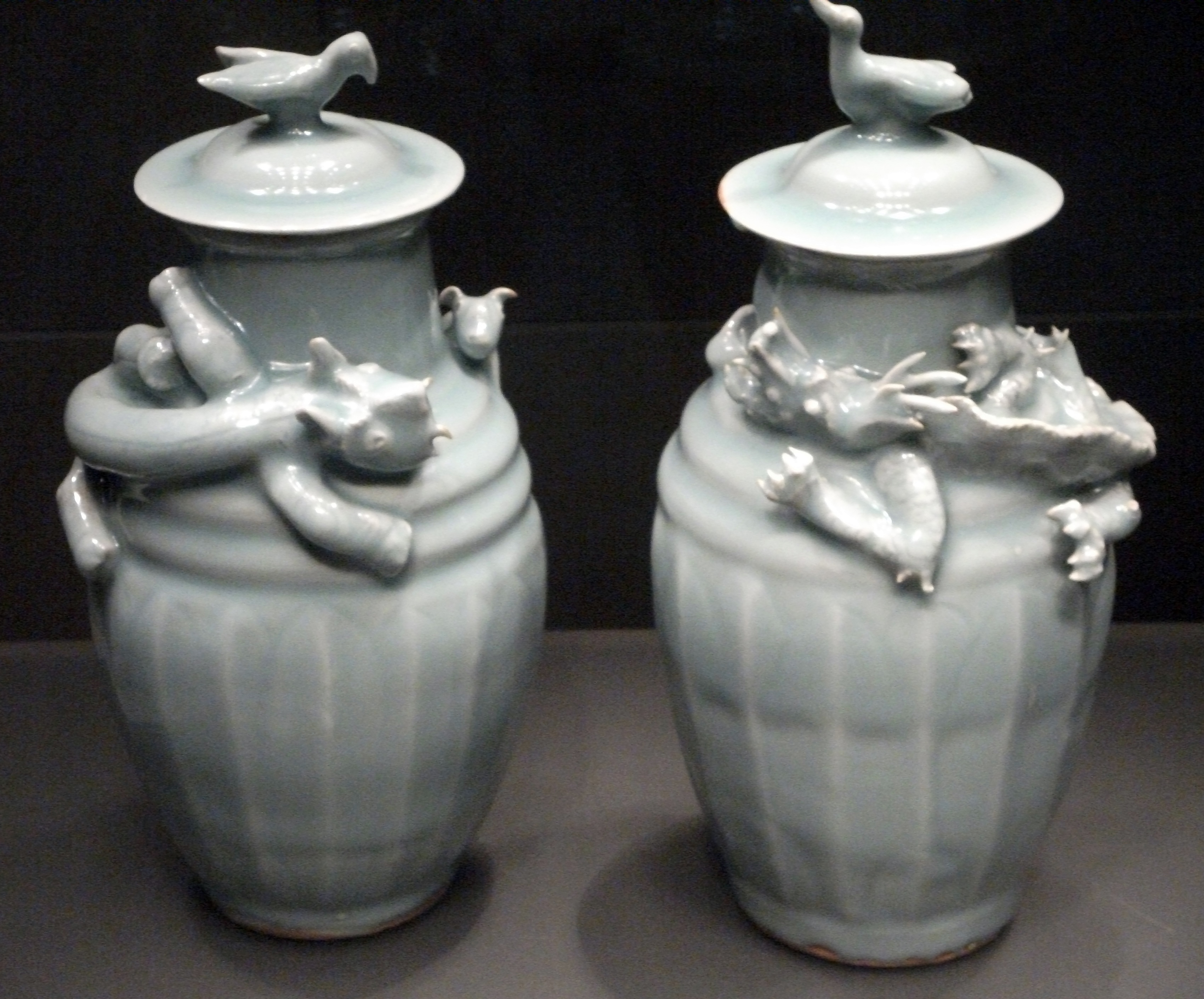
Longquan celadon covered vases

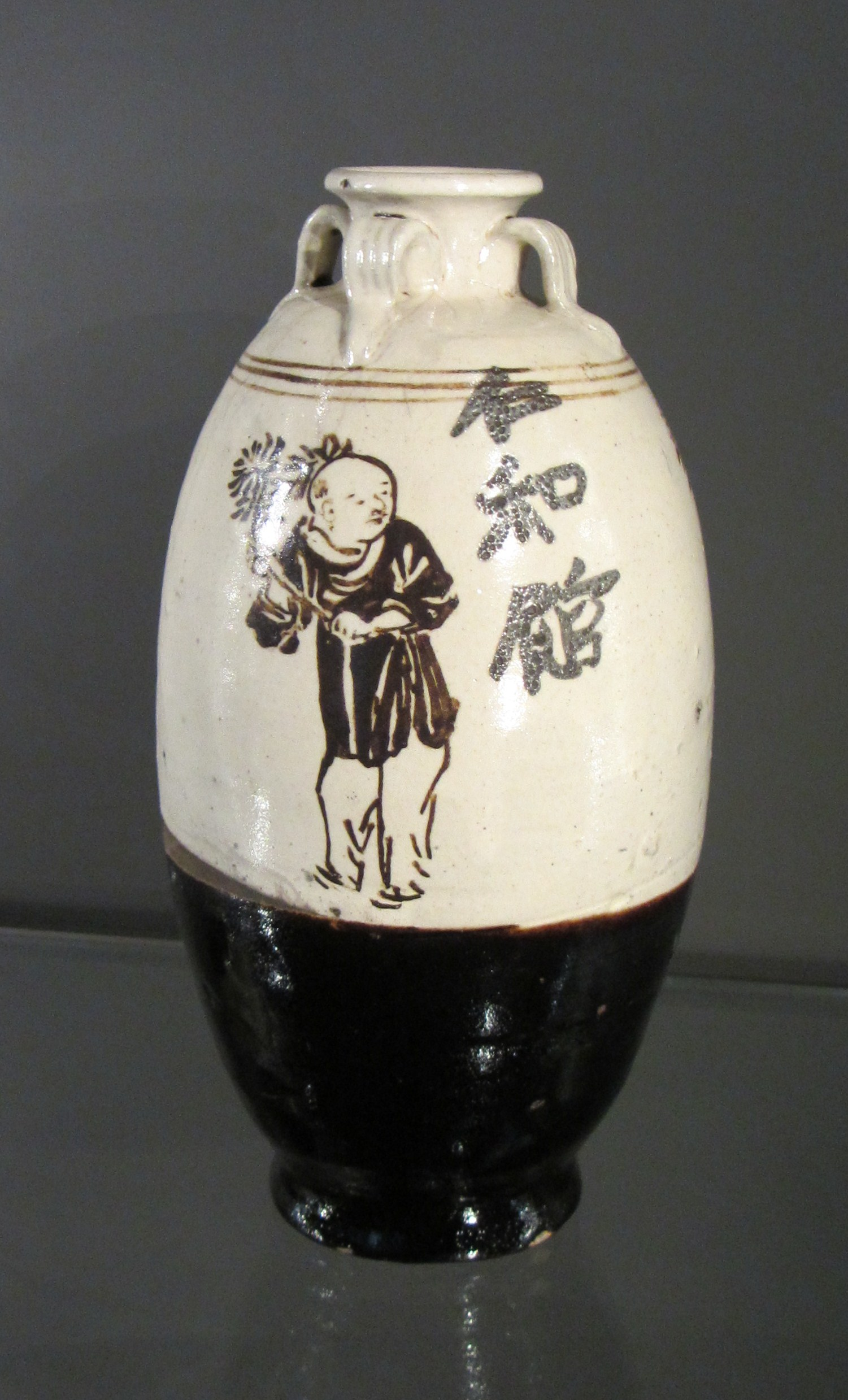
Cizhou ware wine jar, for an inn, 1115–1234

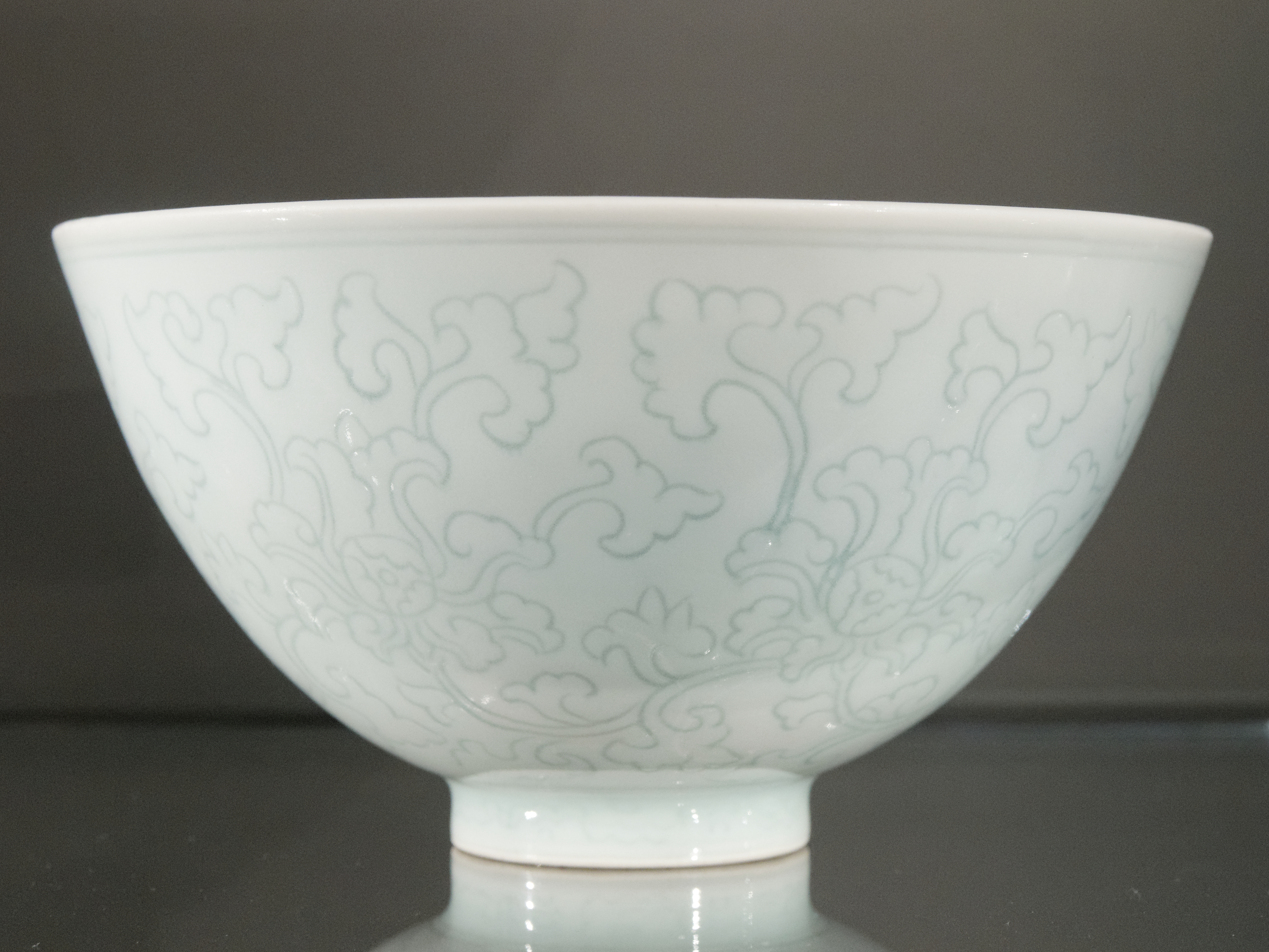
Ming bowl with peony design, PDF 704

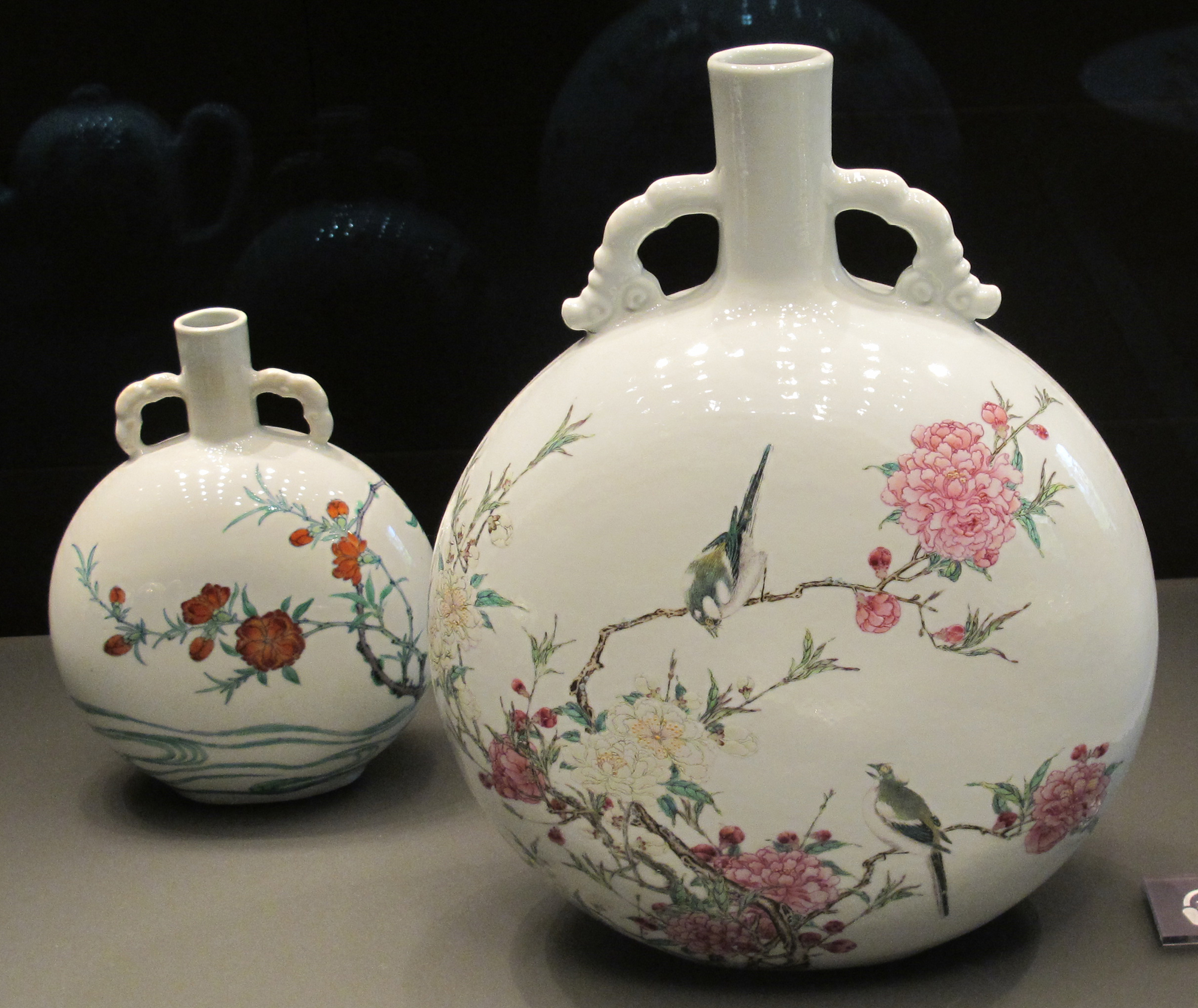
Moon flasks in famille rose (right) and doucai (left), Qing 1723–35

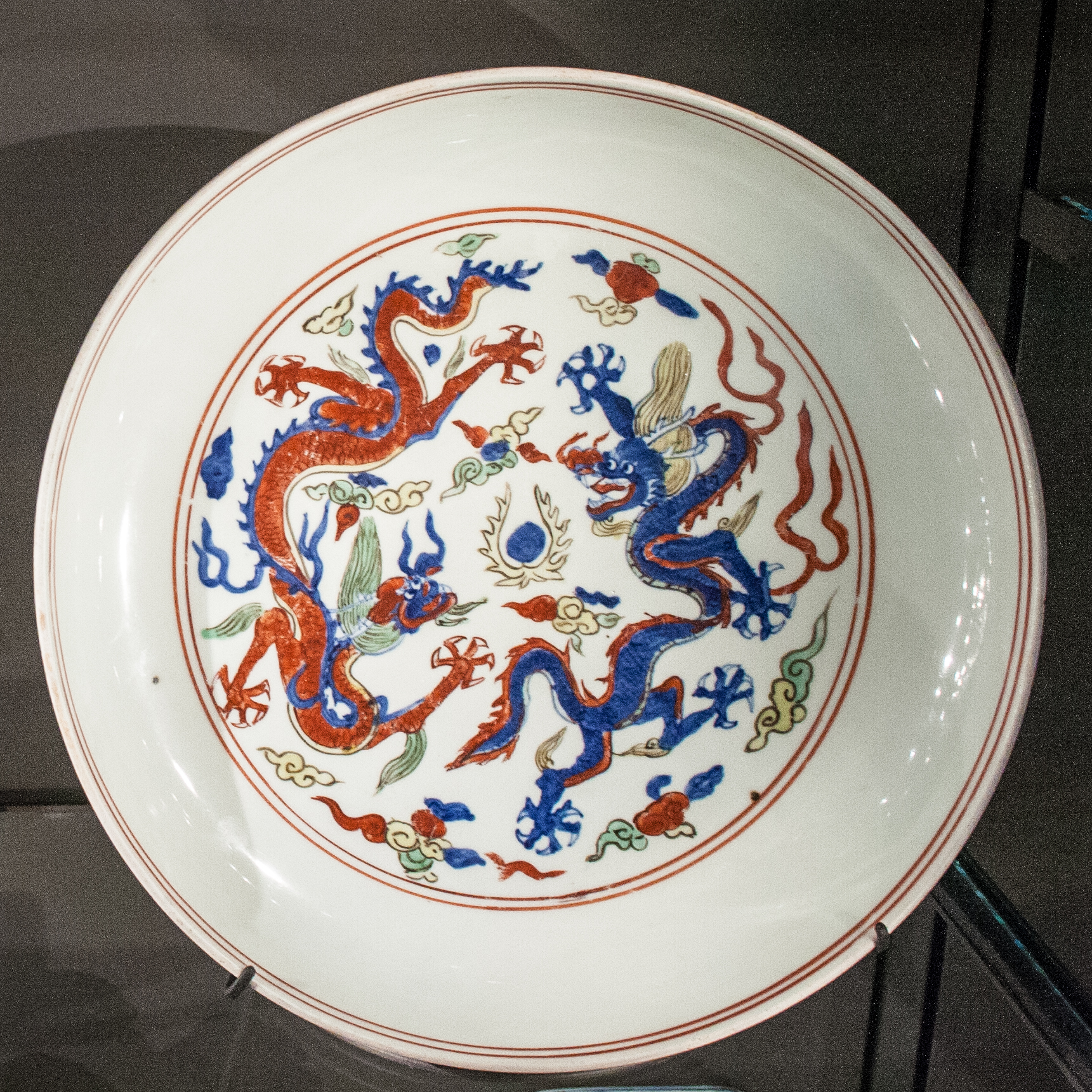
Wucai dish with dragons chasing flaming pearls, Ming, Longqing mark and period, 1567–1572, PDF 798

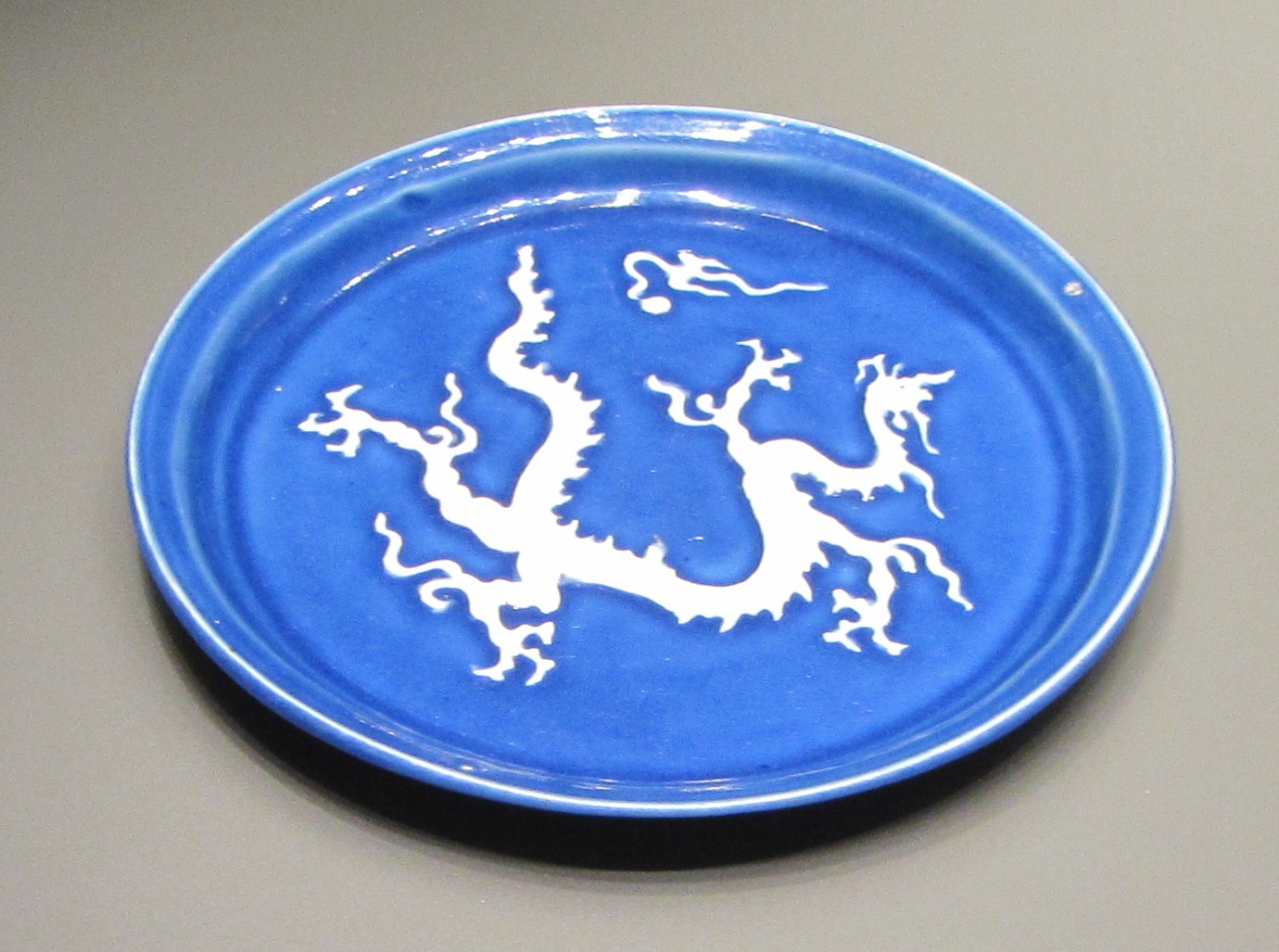
White dragon on a blue ground, produced with a rarely-used technique, Jingdezhen, Yuan dynasty

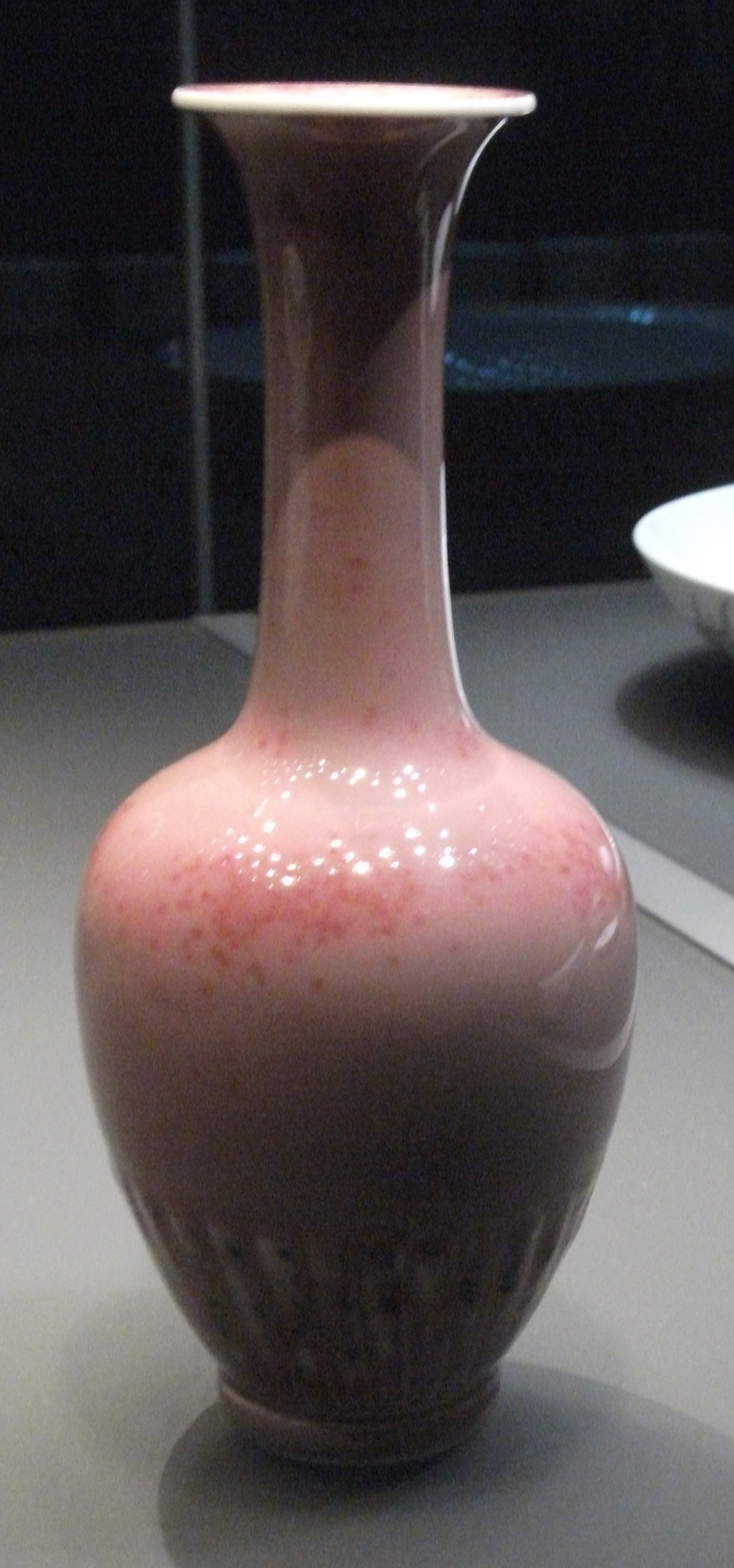
Vase with peach blossom glaze, Jingdezhen, Kangxi period. PDF 579

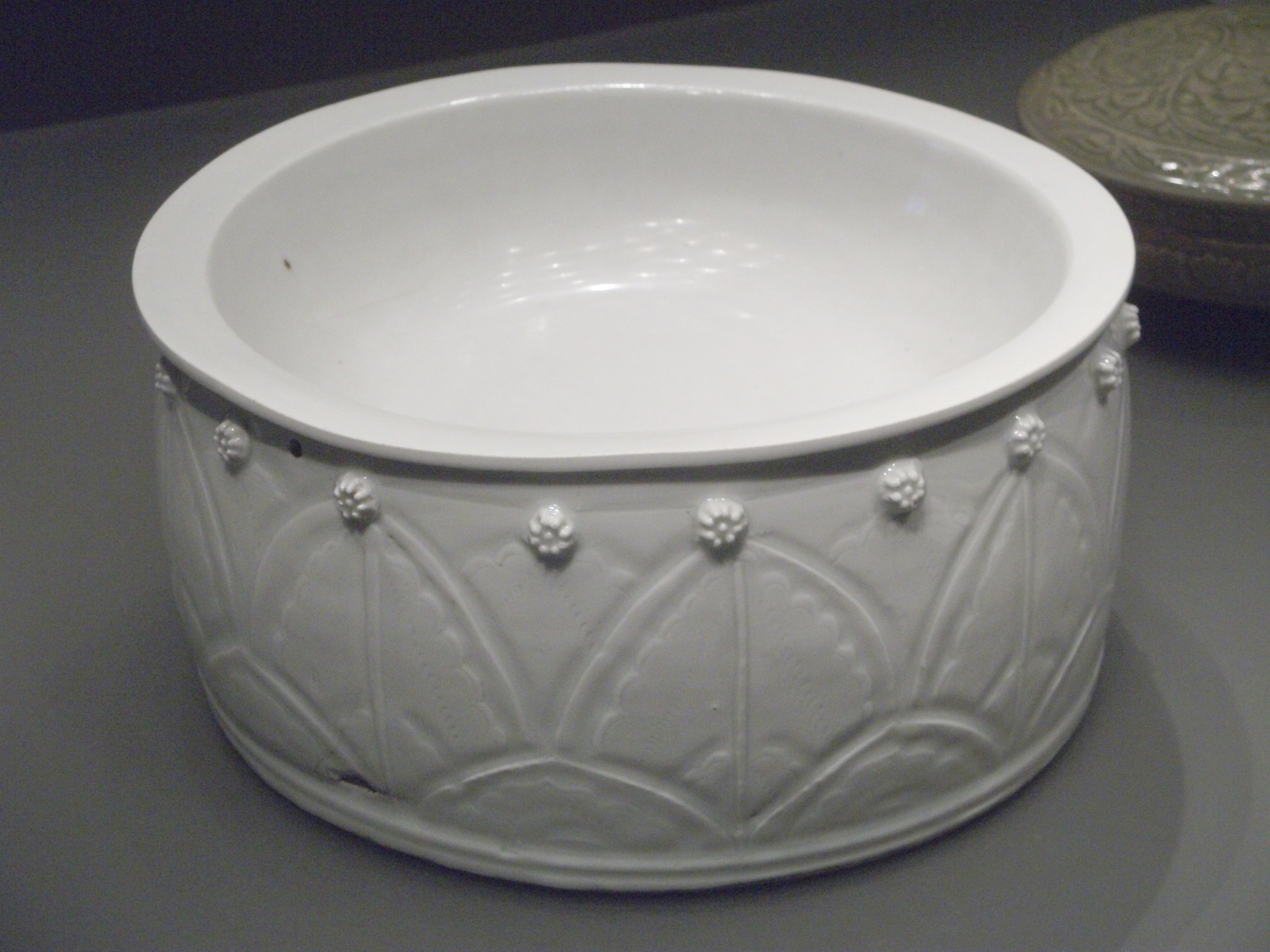
Xing ware from the Tang dynasty

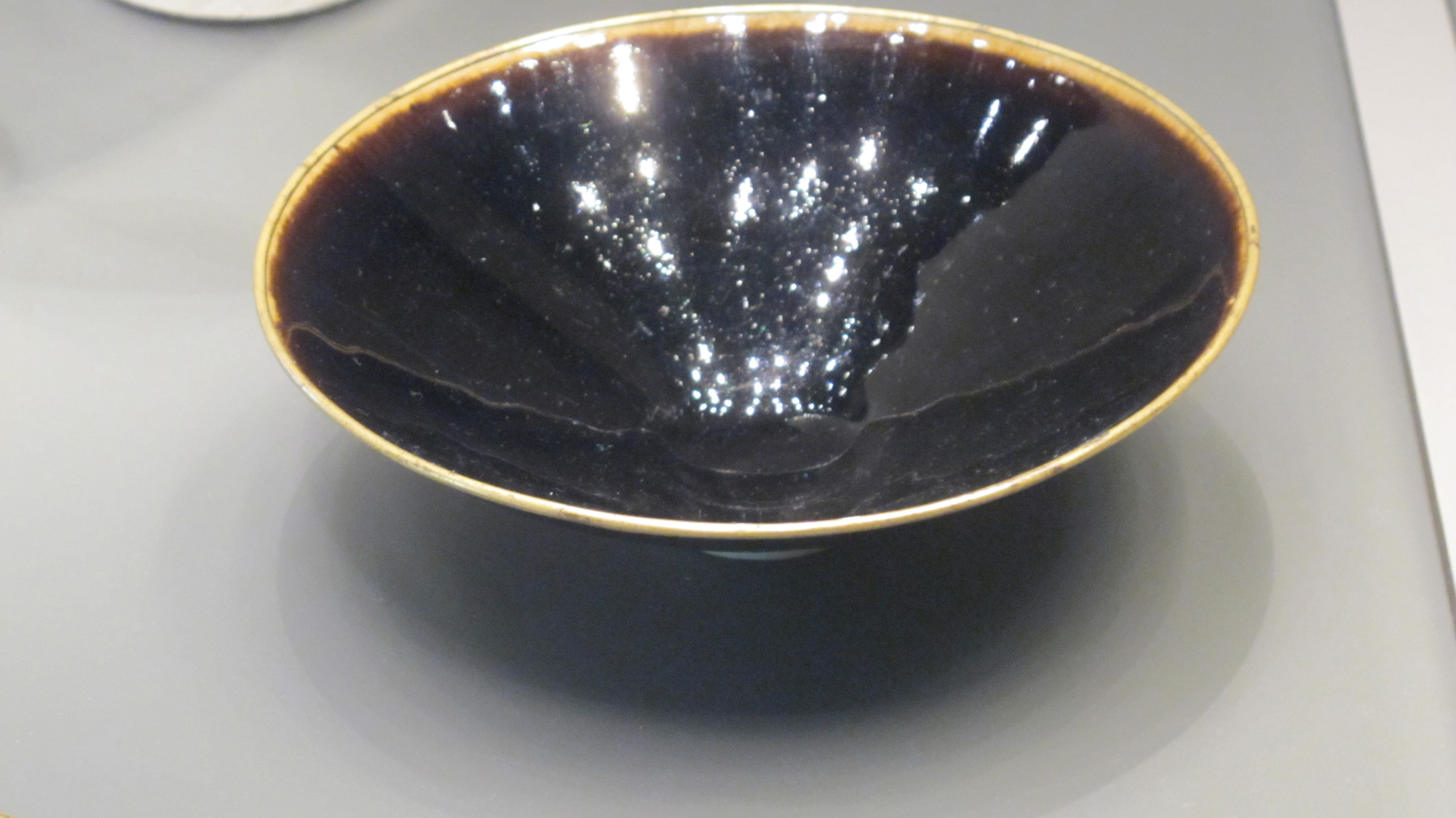
An unusual black-glazed Ding ware, Northern Song

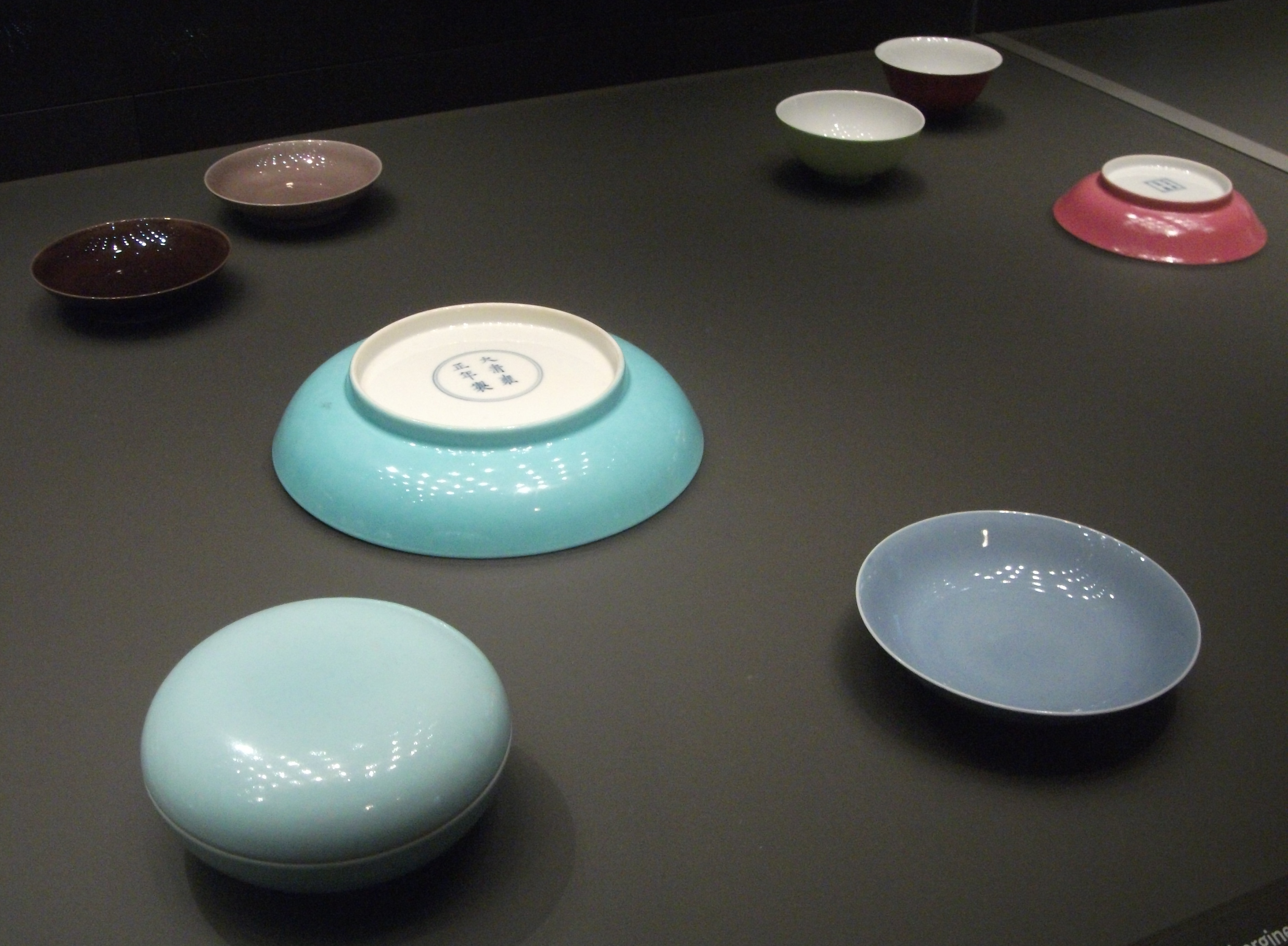
Monochrome porcelains, Qing dynasty

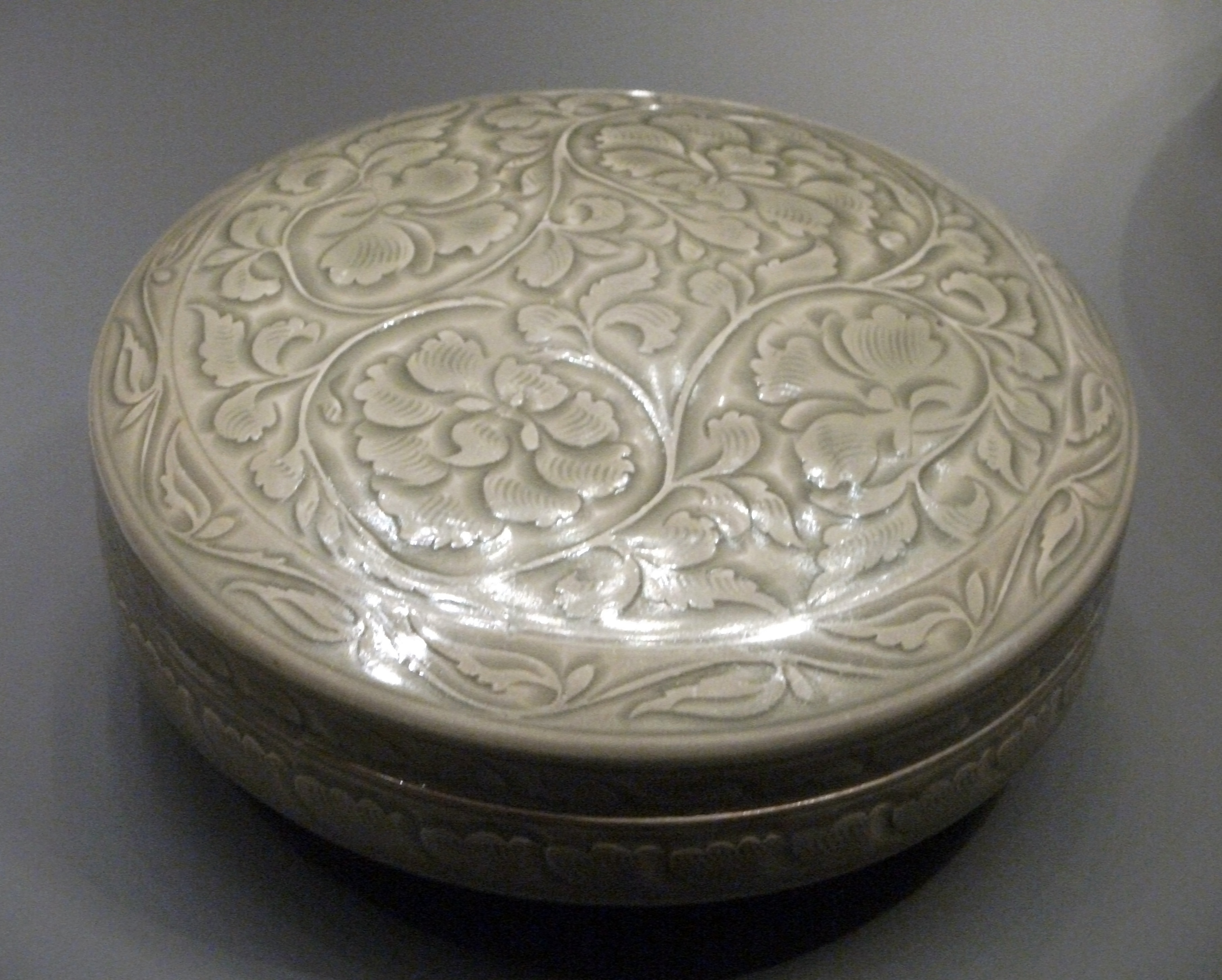
Yaozhou ware box

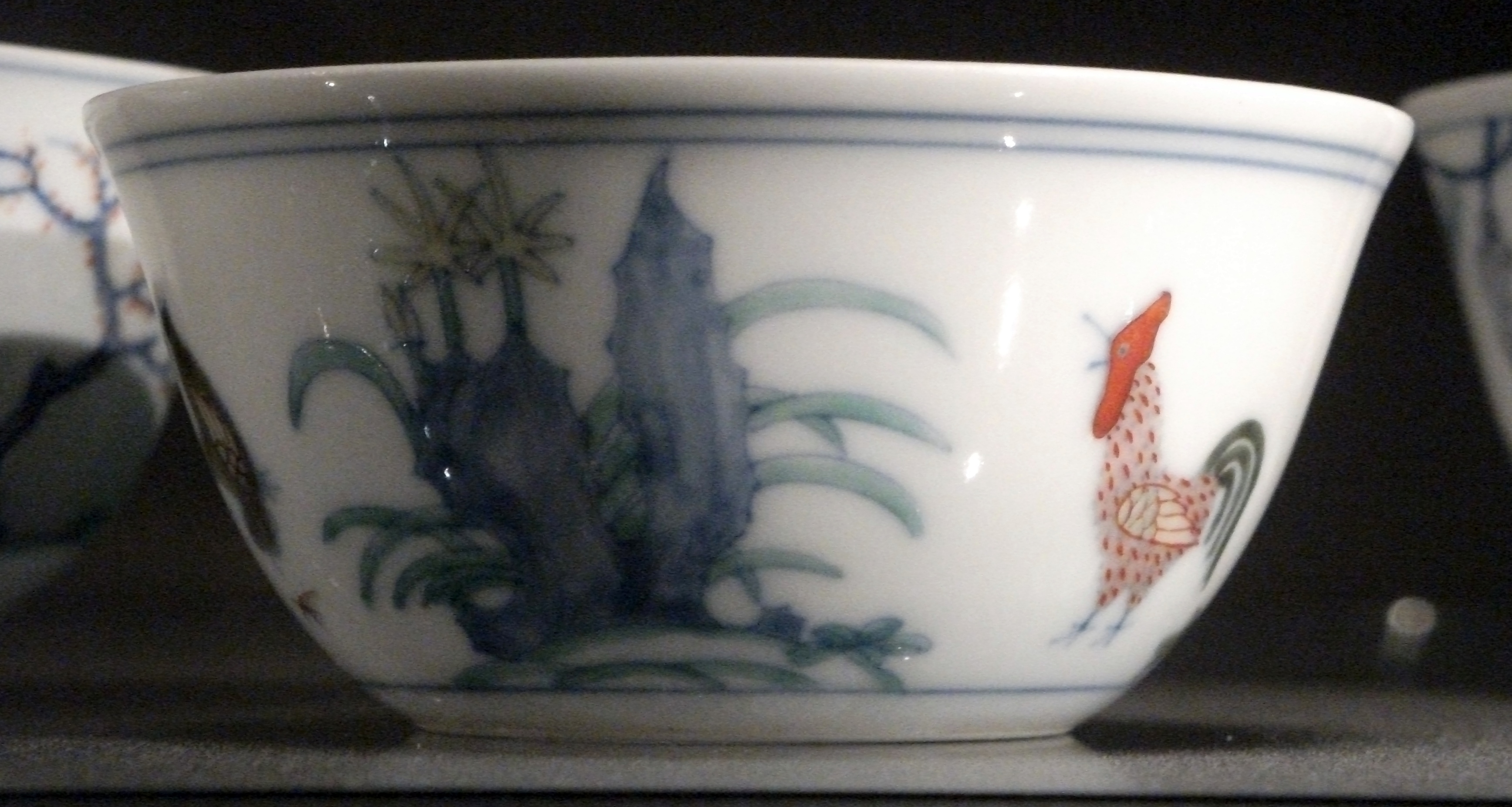
Chicken cup in doucai

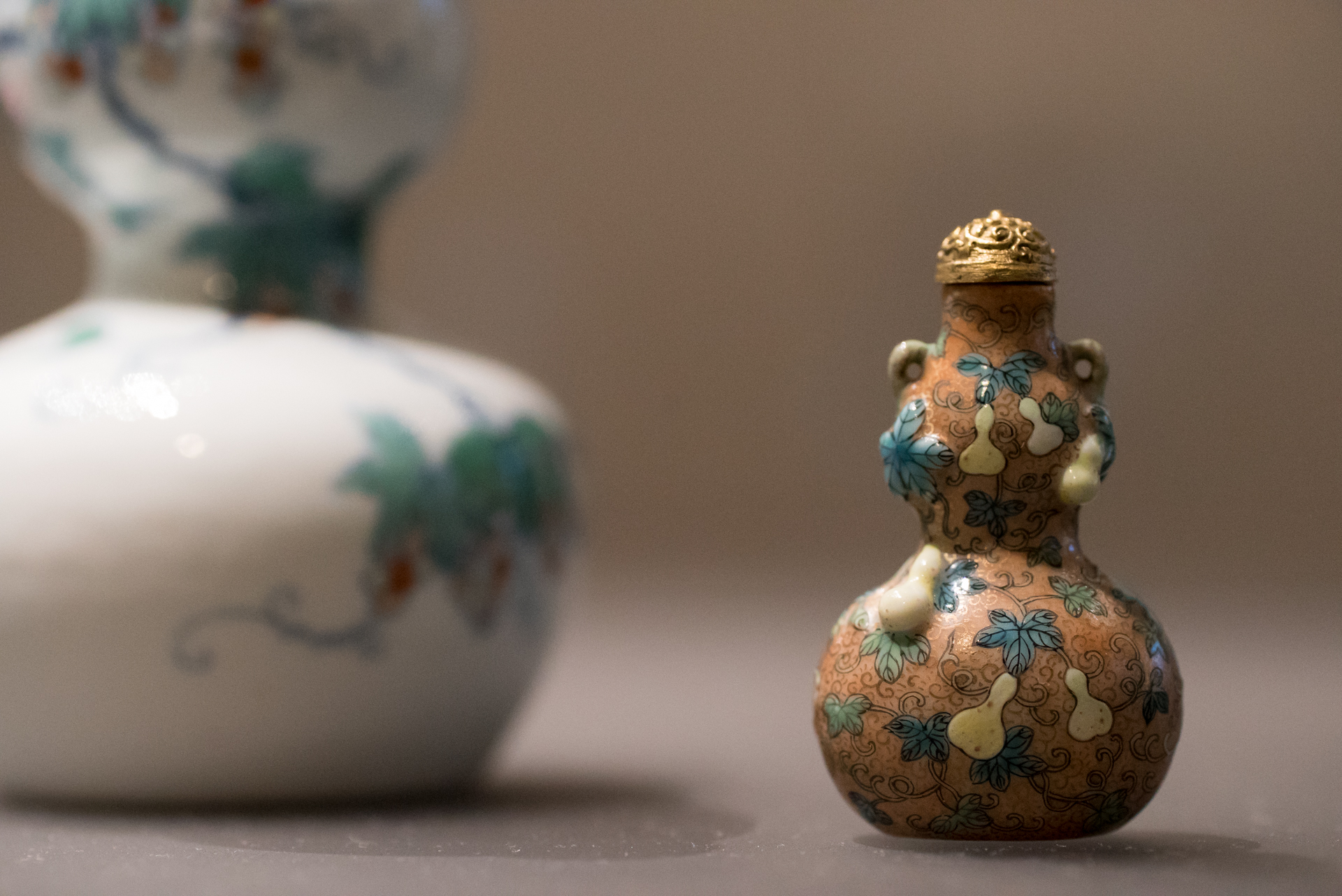
Snuff bottle, painted porcelain, Qianlong period

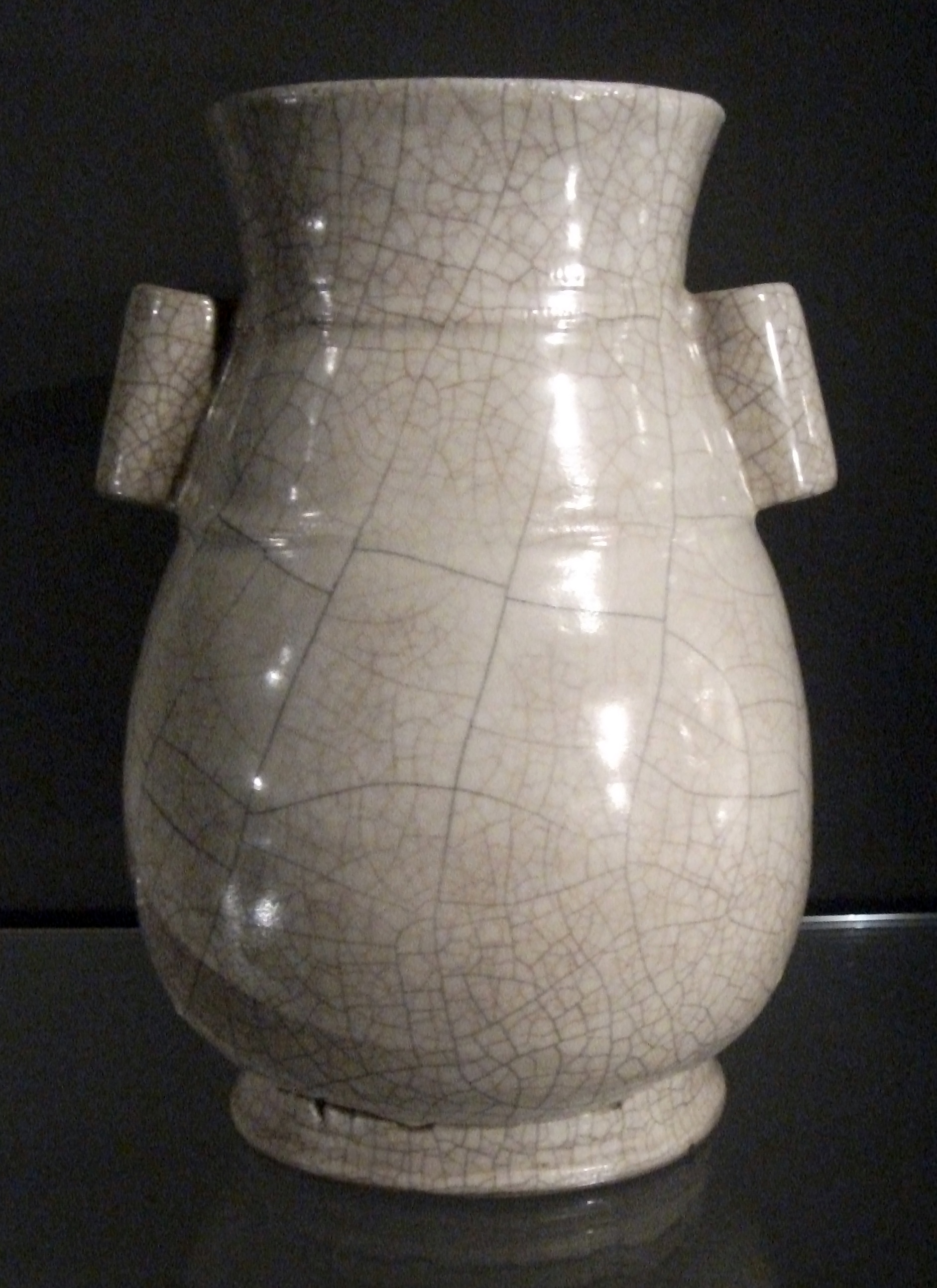
Ge ware, vase based on an ancient bronze form, Yuan dynasty

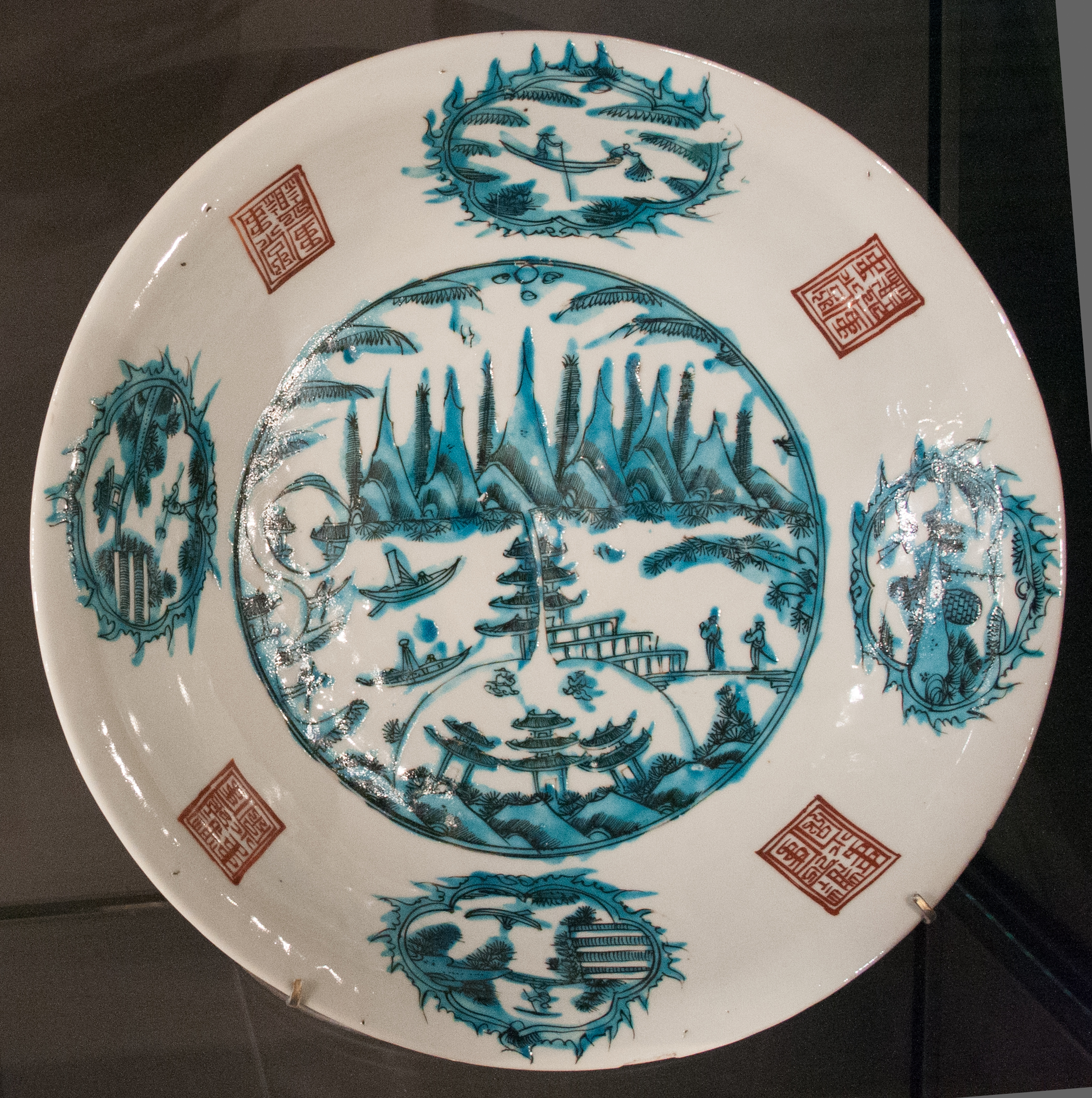
Swatow ware dish with the path to the island of immortals. Unusually for the collection, popular ware for export

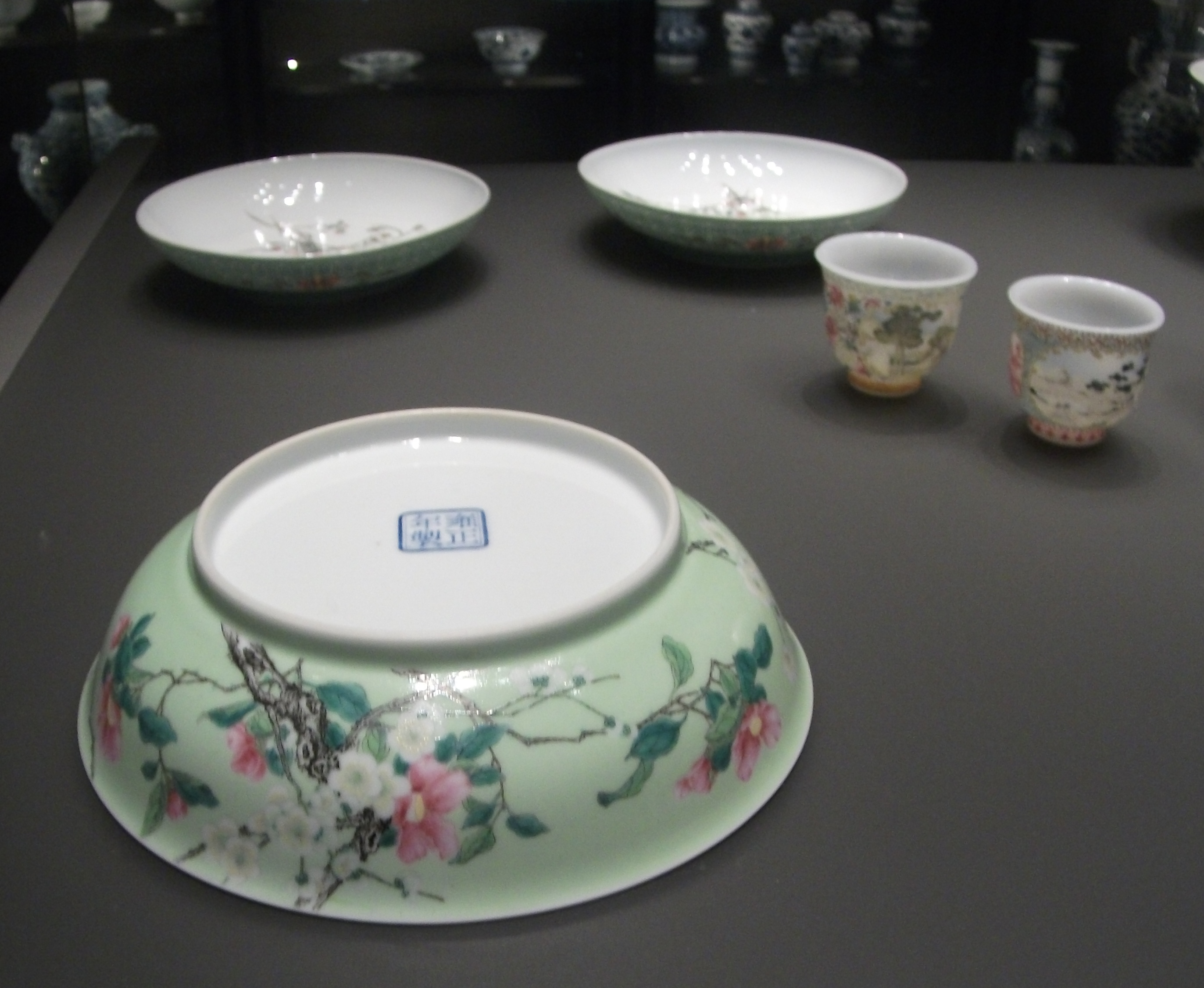
Falangcai porcelain, Qing dynasty
