= Sassoon David =

Indian merchant and textile mill-owner (1849–1926)

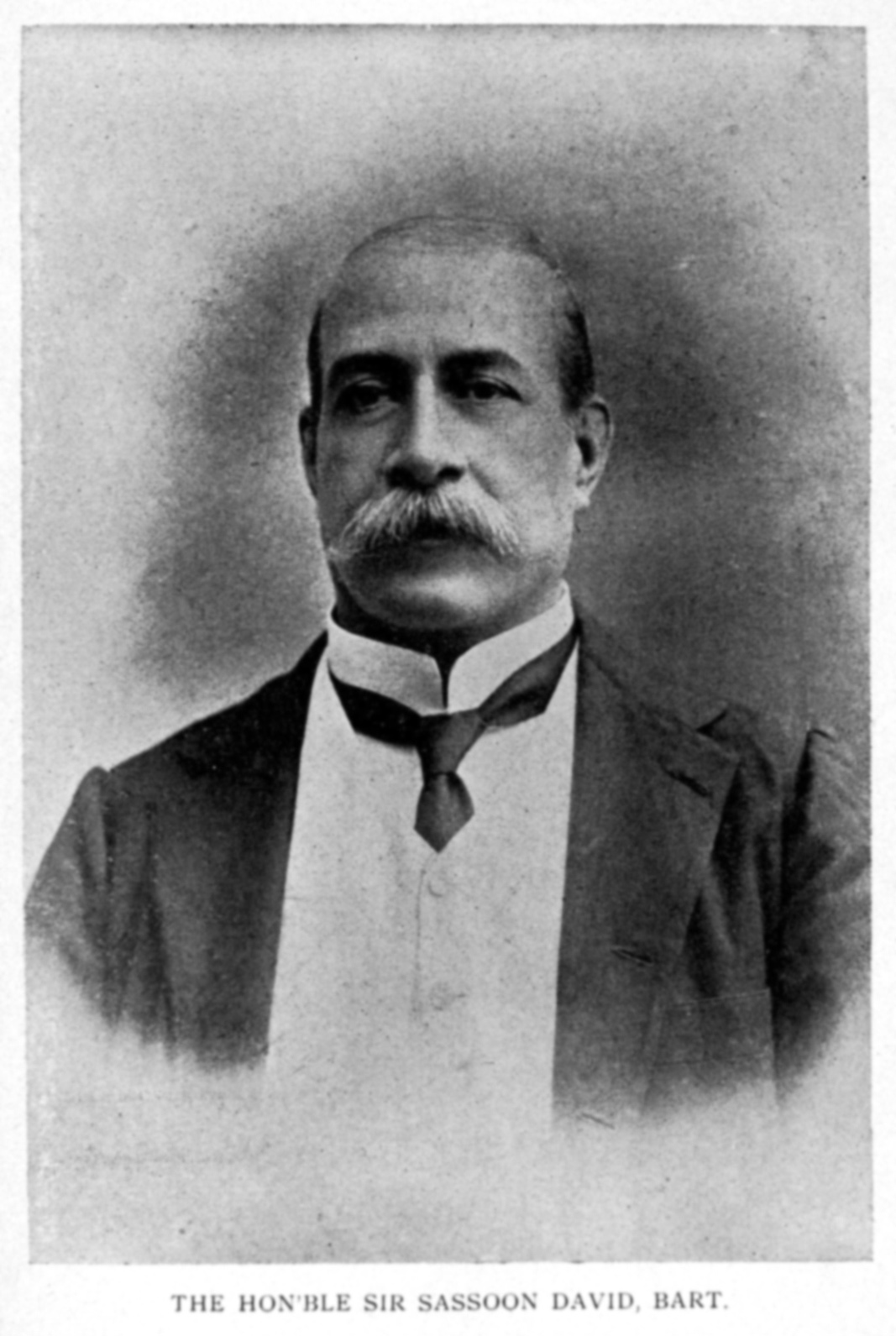
Sir Sassoon Jacob Hai David

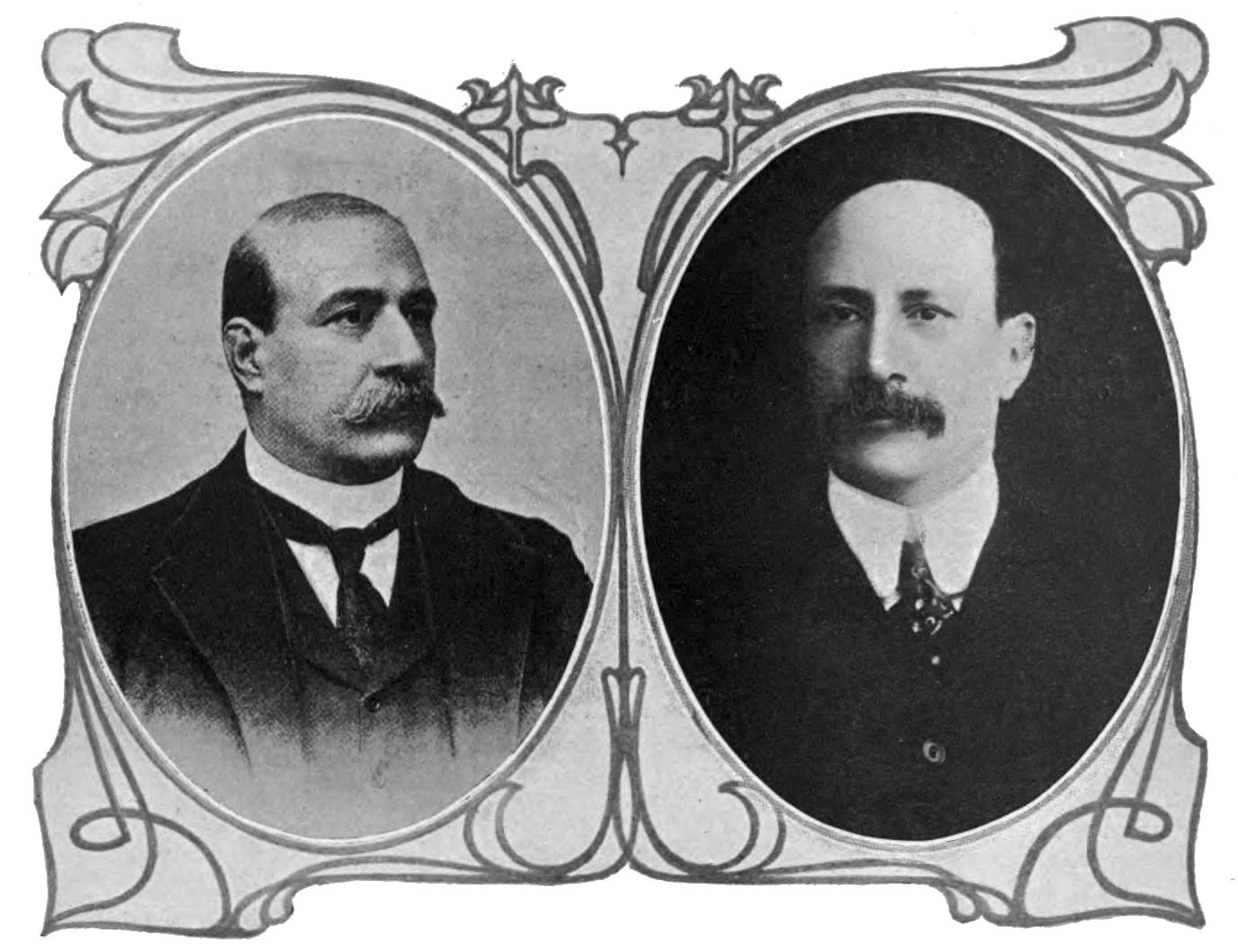
Sir Jacob Hai David Sassoon and his brother Abraham Aubrey J David

Sir Sassoon Jacob Hai David, 1st Baronet, KCSI (11 December 1849 – 27 November 1926) was an Indian merchant who was a member of the community of Baghdadi Jews who lived in Bombay from the late 19th century into the 20th century. He was a textile mill-owner and merchant who also became Chairman of the Bank of India.

== Life and career ==
In 1867 Sir Sassoon Jacob Hai David joined the newly formed firm of his father in law, "E.D. Sassoon & Co.", which traded predominantly in India (Bombay, Karachi) and China (Hong Kong, Shanghai). In 1885 he started in Bombay his own firm, "Sassoon J. David & Co., Ltd.", which developed into a leading cotton merchant and opened branches in China (Hong Kong, Shanghai) and Japan (Kobe). But the company also dealt in Indian opium and held the Hong Kong agency for the "South British Insurance Company" (now part of IAG New Zealand).

As a wealthy businessman, he was the lead promoter of the Bank of India, founded in 1906, and became the bank's chairman. He served as Sheriff of Bombay for 1905 and was created a baronet in 1911. He served on the council of the governor general of India, on the Imperial Legislative Council and the Bombay Municipal Corporation for twenty years, becoming its president in 1921. He was made KCSI in the 1922 Birthday Honours.

He partly financed the construction of the arch-monument Gateway of India.

== Family ==
Sir Sassoon Jacob Hai David was the son of Jacob Isaac David, a leading member of the Jewish community who was amongst the first Jews to move to Bombay. He married Hannah Sassoon, the daughter of Elias David Sassoon and granddaughter of David Sassoon. His eldest three sons predeceased him and he was therefore succeeded by his surviving son Sir Percival David, 2nd Baronet. Sir Sassoon Jacob Hai David's brother, Abraham Aubrey J David (1854–?), was largely responsible for the successful built up of China business of "Sassoon J. David & Co., Ltd.".

== Arms ==
Coat of arms of Sassoon David
Coronet A coronet of a Baron Crest A harp Or between two branches of olive slipped Proper. Escutcheon Or a lion dormant Azure on a chief of the last two triangles interlaced between on the dexter a harp and on the sinister a lily leaved and slipped all of the first. Motto Deus Pastor Meus

== See also ==
- David Sassoon
- Sassoon family
- David Sassoon & Co.
- E.D. Sassoon & Co.
- History of opium in China

Baronetage of the United Kingdom
New creation	Baronet (of Bombay); 1911–1926	Succeeded by Percival David
