= Dorothy Elaine Vicaji =

English portrait painter

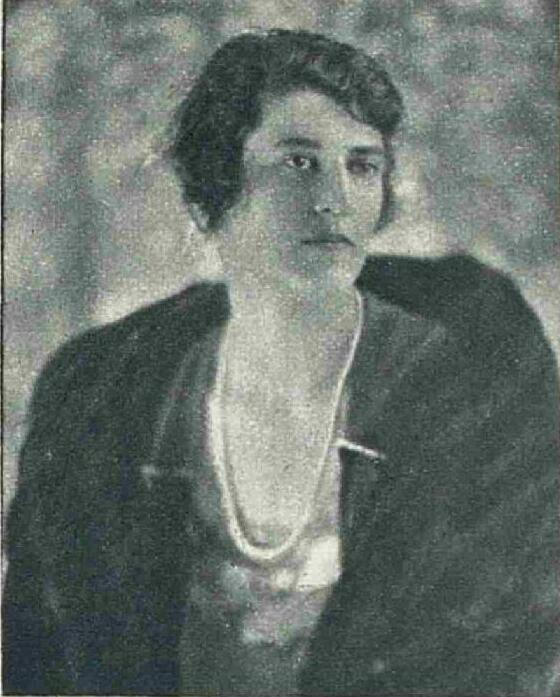
Vicaji in 1919

Dorothy Elaine Vicaji (1890 - 13 February 1945) was an English portrait painter.

== Early life ==
Dorothy Elaine Vicaji was born in London in 1890 to Jessie Julia (née Watts) and Anglo-Indian artist Rustom Vicaji (1857–1934), who had married in Fulham in June 1889. She lived at 17 Holly Mount, Hampstead during her childhood.

The New Yorker magazine described her grandfather as a Persian moneylender who acquired a major landholding in India (Berar) that was taken back by its former ruler in an invasion. She studied at the Slade School of Fine Art.

== Career ==
The New York Times described her as a painter of "royalty and society folk". She worked in the United States and in Canada. The Illustrated London News reported on a 1926 exhibition of her work and included images of several of her portraits.

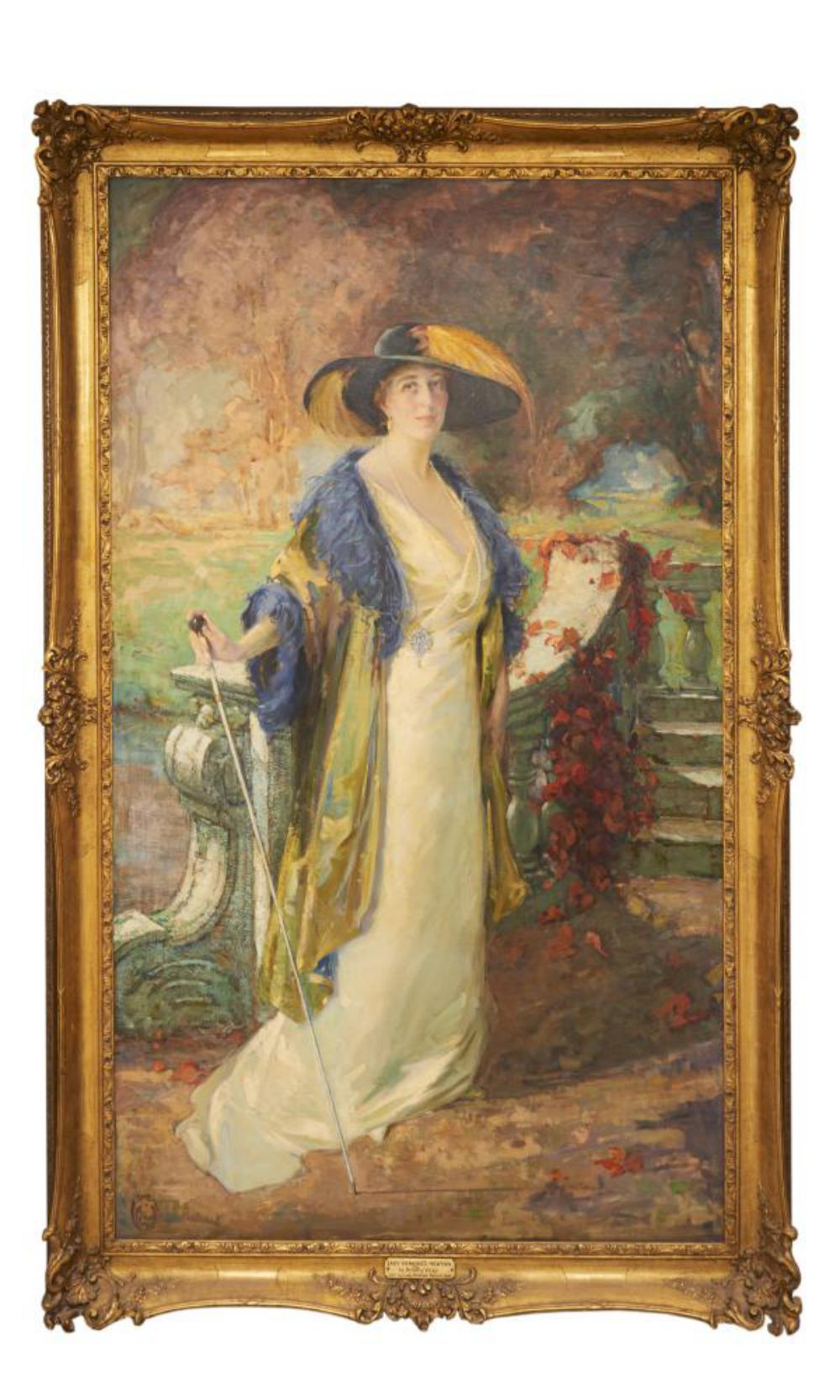
Catherine Mary Sermonda Henniker Heaton, wife of the 2nd Baronet, painted by Dorothy Elaine Vicaji

Vicaji painted Queen Alexandra and Margaret Lloyd George. She painted Baron Joseph Duveen, and his daughter, Dorothy Dunveen. She painted an Argentinian dancer. She did a portrait of Mrs. Oliver Harriman. She painted Sir Robert Borden, Lady Byng, and Prime Minister Louis-Alexandre Taschereau. In Canada she worked in Montreal, Quebec, and Ottawa. She spent time in The Spur gave a favorable accounting of her work including a painting of Mrs. Norman Stines of San Francisco.

Vicaji's painting Cottages in a Wooded Glade was signed D. E. Vicaji.

The Thomas Edison National Historical Park's collection includes her work.
