= David baronets =

Extinct baronetcy in the Baronetage of the United Kingdom

- Escutcheon of the David baronets of Bombay
- Creation date: 1911
- Status: extinct
- Extinction date: 1964
- Motto: Deus Pastor Meus, The Lord is my shepherd
- Arms: Or a lion dormant Azure on a chief of the last two triangles interlaced between on the dexter a harp and on the sinister a lily leaved and slipped all of the first
- Crest: A harp Or between two branches of olive slipped Proper

The David baronetcy, of Bombay, was a title in the Baronetage of the United Kingdom. It was created on 12 December 1911 for the Baghdadi Jewish businessman Sassoon David. He was succeeded by his son, Percival, the 2nd Baronet, who became an important collector of Chinese porcelain. The title became extinct on the latter's death in 1964.

== David baronets, of Bombay (1911) ==
- Sir Sassoon Jacob Hai David, 1st Baronet (1849–1926)
- Sir Percival Victor David, 2nd Baronet (1892–1964), left no male heir.

Baronetage of the United Kingdom
Preceded by Assheton-Smith baronets	David baronets of Bombay; 12 December 1911	Succeeded by Heaton baronets
