= David Vases =

Blue-and-white temple vases from the Yuan dynasty

The David Vases
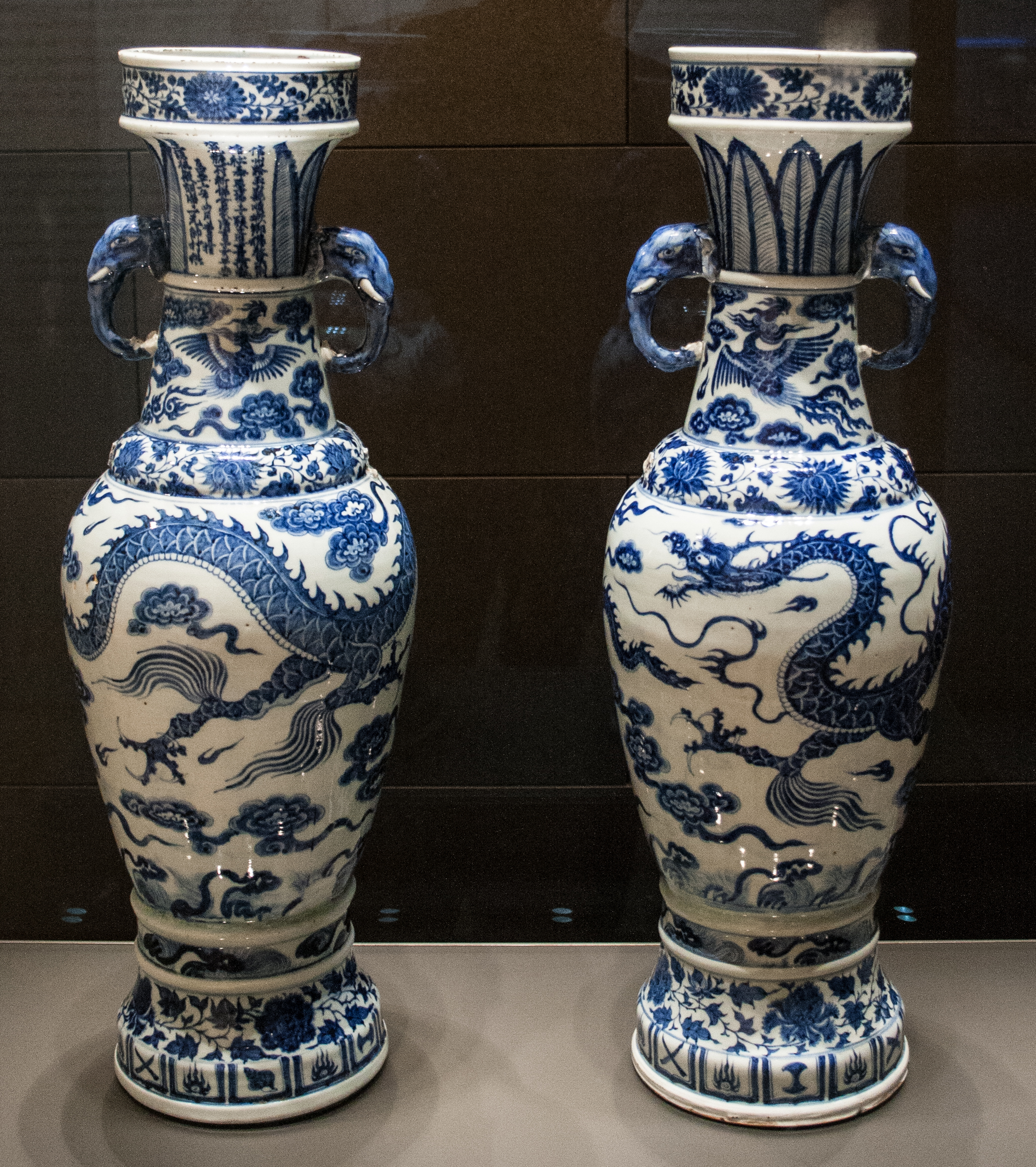
- Year: 1351
- Type: Blue and white
- Medium: Porcelain
- Dimensions: 63.5 cm × 20.5 cm (25.0 in × 8.1 in)
- Location: British Museum, London

The David Vases are a pair of blue-and-white temple vases from the Yuan dynasty. The vases have been described as the "best-known porcelain vases in the world" and among the most important blue-and-white Chinese porcelains.

Though they are fine examples of their type, their special significance comes from the date in the inscriptions on the vases. It made them the earliest-dated blue-and-white porcelains known at the time of their acquisition, although blue-and-white porcelains are likely to have been made earlier. The vases are named after Sir Percival David who collected the vases from two different sources, and formed part of the collection of the Percival David Foundation of Chinese Art but are now on permanent display in the British Museum.

== Provenence ==
The vases are Jingdezhen porcelain, commissioned by someone named Zhang Wenjin (張文進) from Yushan County to be presented as altar pieces, alongside an incense burner that has not been found, to a Daoist temple in Xingyuan (星源, present day Wuyuan County, Jiangxi) in 1351. It has been proposed that the vases were manufactured at the Hengfeng Zhen kilns near the temple. Long inscriptions were added to the vases, which gives their date of production.

David acquired the vases from two separate sources; the first from Mountstuart Elphinstone in the 1920s, the second from an auction in 1935 of the collection of Charles E. Russell. Russell was said to have acquired his vase from a Chinese collector Wu Lai-Hsi (吳賴熙, Wu Laixi), who in turn was claimed to have bought it from a priest of Zhilun temple in eastern Beijing, although this fact could not be verified.

== Descriptions ==
The shape of the vases is based on bronze vessels. They are painted in underglazed cobalt blue with images of a number of auspicious motifs. On the main body of each vase is painted a four-clawed dragon surrounded by clouds. Above is a band of lotus scroll, and on the neck are flying phoenixes, as well as a band of overlapping plantain leaves. Around the mouth is a chrysanthemum scroll, and at the foot is a peony scroll above petal panels containing various auspicious symbols. On the neck are two elephant heads forming two handles. Originally, the vases had porcelain rings suspended from the handles. There are a few small differences in decorations between the two vases, for example, the mouth of the dragon is closed in one but open in the other.

=== Inscriptions ===
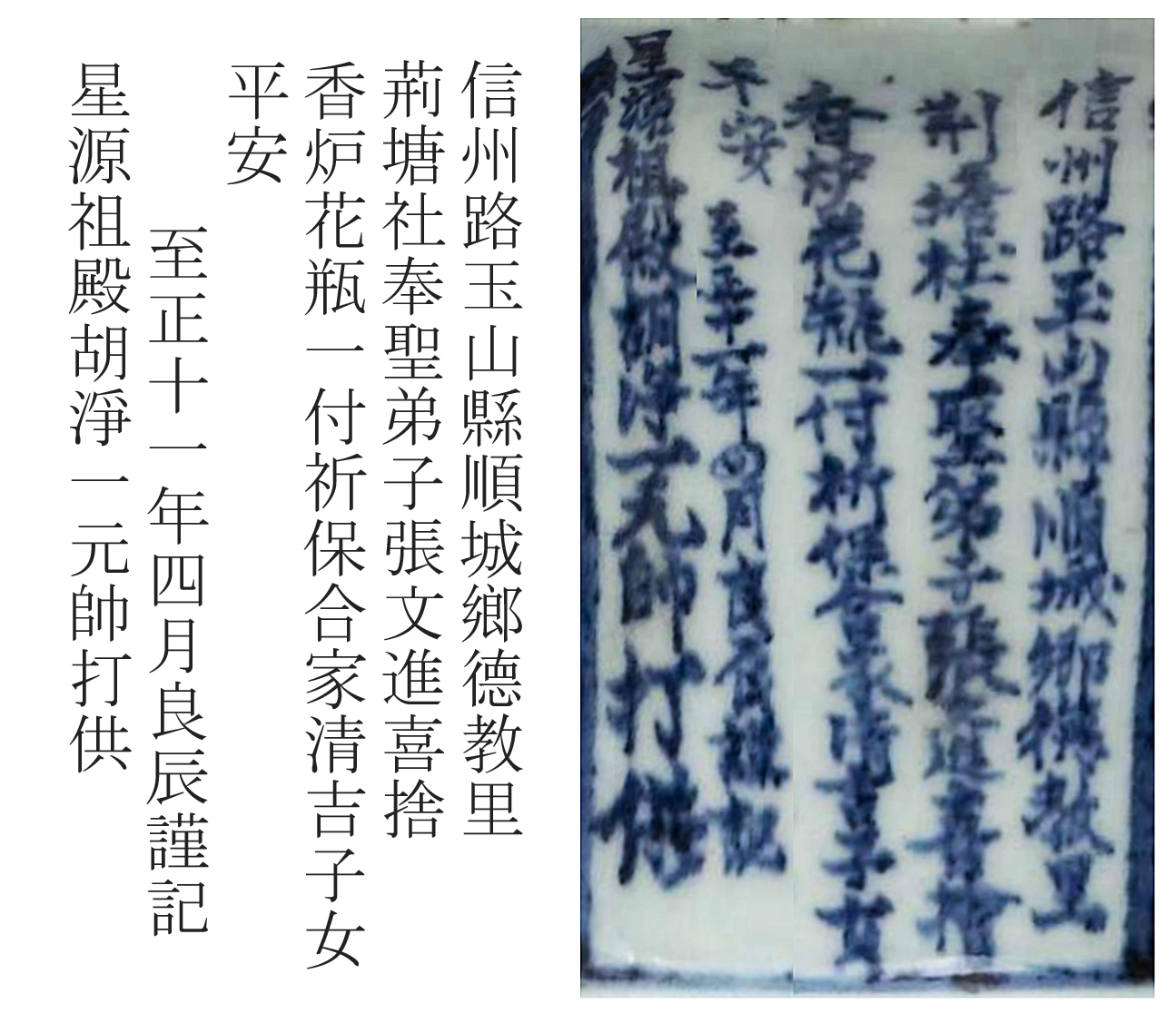
One of the inscriptions. In the other inscription, the last four characters in the penultimate line "良辰謹記" ("reverently recorded on a propitious day") are replaced by "吉日捨" ("offers on an auspicious day").

On the neck of the vases are inscribed dedications by Zhang. There are minor differences in inscriptions between the two vases, some characters have been changed in one inscription, but they have essentially the same meaning: The inscription of one vase reads:

信州路玉山縣順城鄉德教里荊塘社奉聖弟子張文進喜捨香炉花瓶一付祈保合家清吉子女平安 至正十一年四月良辰謹記 星源祖殿胡淨一元帥打供

The respectful disciple of the sages, Zhang Wenjin from Jintang Section of Dejiao Lane, Shungchen Village, Yushan County of Xingzhou Circuit, happily presents a set of incense burner and flower vases as prayer for the protection of the whole family and for peace and prosperity of his descendants. Recorded in reverent remembrance on a propitious day in the 11th year and 4th month of the Zhizheng era, as offering for the Xingyuan temple of Generalissimo Hujingyi.

The 11th year of the Zhizheng era dates the vases to 1351. The incense burner mentioned in the inscriptions has not been found. It has been noted that the inscriptions have miswritten characters and are not carefully spaced, therefore they could not have been written by a court official. The ability to commission expensive high quality porcelain from an official kiln, and the use of royal insignias of dragons and phoenixes but with substandard written inscriptions, raised question as to who Zhang Wenjin might have been. The vases were commissioned during a period of peasant revolts, and it has been speculated the name may have been an alias of the rebel Zhang Shicheng.

== Significance ==
=== Dating ===
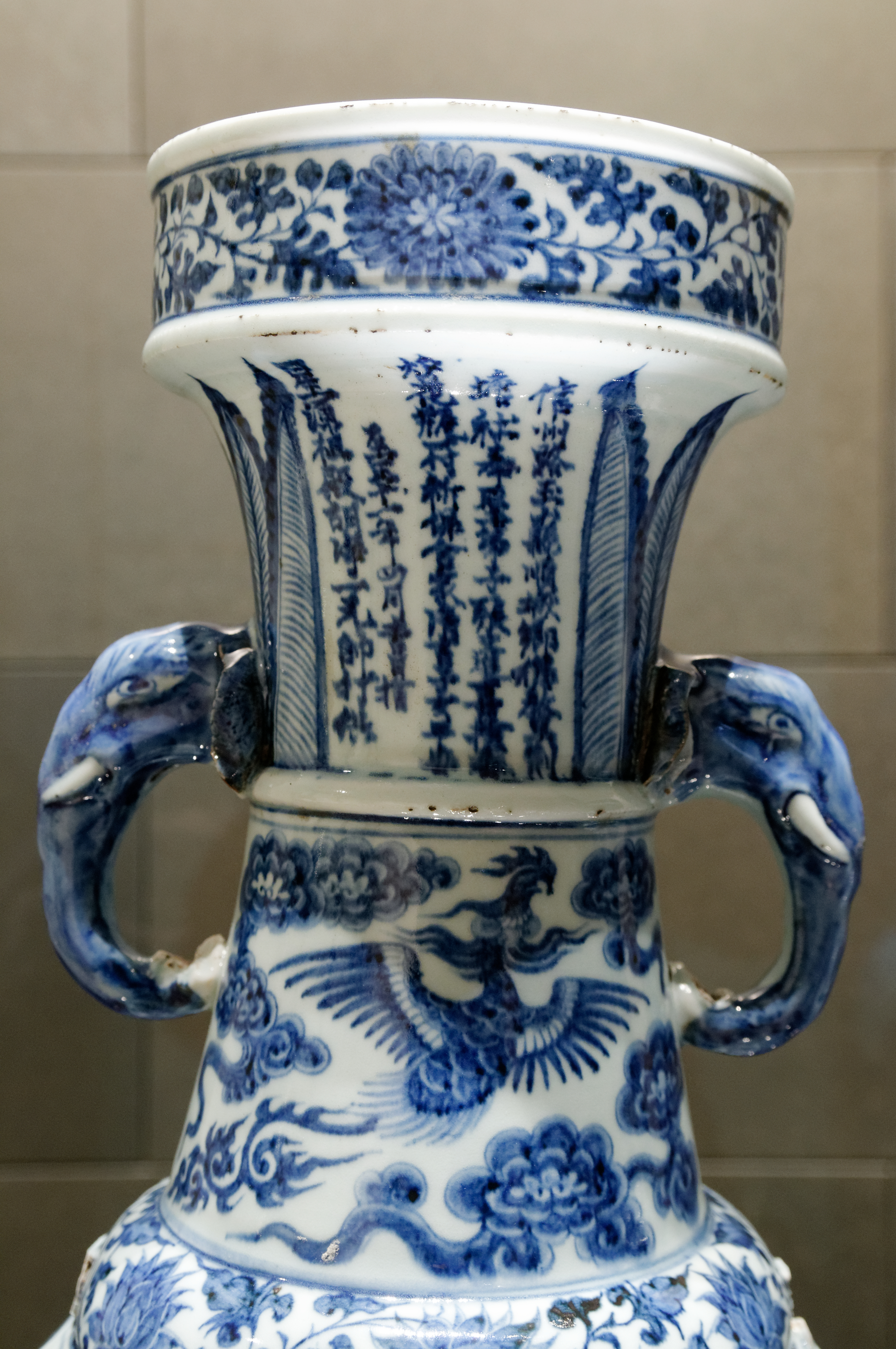
Detail of the neck portion, with a slightly different inscription from above

The inscriptions on the vases that gives the dates are important for the much-discussed question of when the blue-and-white style was introduced. The date has been given as 1351 (11th year of the Zhizheng era), towards the end of the Yuan dynasty. According to the British Museum they are the earliest dated blue-and-white porcelains. The date suggests that the blue-and-white technique was already sophisticated enough by the late Yuan period for works of such quality to be produced. At the time they were collected by Percival David, the blue and white style was thought to have been invented during the next Ming dynasty, and the vases played a role in overturning that assumption and placing it under the Yuan dynasty. However, some scholars now push the date even further back, to the Song dynasty. Isolated examples of blue-and-white ceramics from the Tang dynasty have also been found, for example, a blue and white stoneware plate with floral motif (cobalt-blue pigment over white slip), manufactured in kilns in Gongxian, Henan, was found in the Belitung shipwreck, dated ca. 825–850 during the Tang dynasty.

=== Blue and white standard ===
As the only firmly dated Yuan dynasty porcelains for many years, the vases have been considered as "one of the main cornerstones in the chronology of blue and white", and "linchpin in studies of the development of Chinese ceramics with underglaze blue decorations", and the standard by which all other Yuan dynasty blue-and-white pieces may be compared. However, it is also argued that the pieces were produced in a period of upheaval and instability in the closing years of the Yuan dynasty, therefore should only be considered as representative of Yuan blue-and-white at its ebb. High quality Yuan porcelain from officially-controlled kilns have since been found.

It was believed that early blue-and-white ware was produced only for export, and that blue-and-white was denigrated in China before it gained acceptance. The early Ming work Gegu Yaolun (格古要論) described blue and multi-coloured ware as "exceedingly vulgar". However, the David vases showed that blue-and-white porcelains were produced for local consumption during the Yuan dynasty, and more Yuan blue-and-white wares have since been uncovered.

== Media ==
The vases are listed in the BBC programme A History of the World in 100 Objects.
