= Henniker-Heaton baronets =

Baronetcy in the Baronetage of the United Kingdom

- Escutcheon of the Henniker-Heaton baronets of Mundarrah Towers
- Creation date: 1912
- Status: extant
- Motto: Lux in litteris, There is light in letters

The Heaton, later Henniker-Heaton Baronetcy, of Mundarrah Towers in Sydney in Australia, is a title in the Baronetage of the United Kingdom. It was created on 31 January 1912 for the Conservative politician and postal reformer John Henniker Heaton. The second Baronet assumed the additional surname of Henniker.

== Heaton, later Henniker-Heaton baronets, of Mundarrah Towers (1912) ==
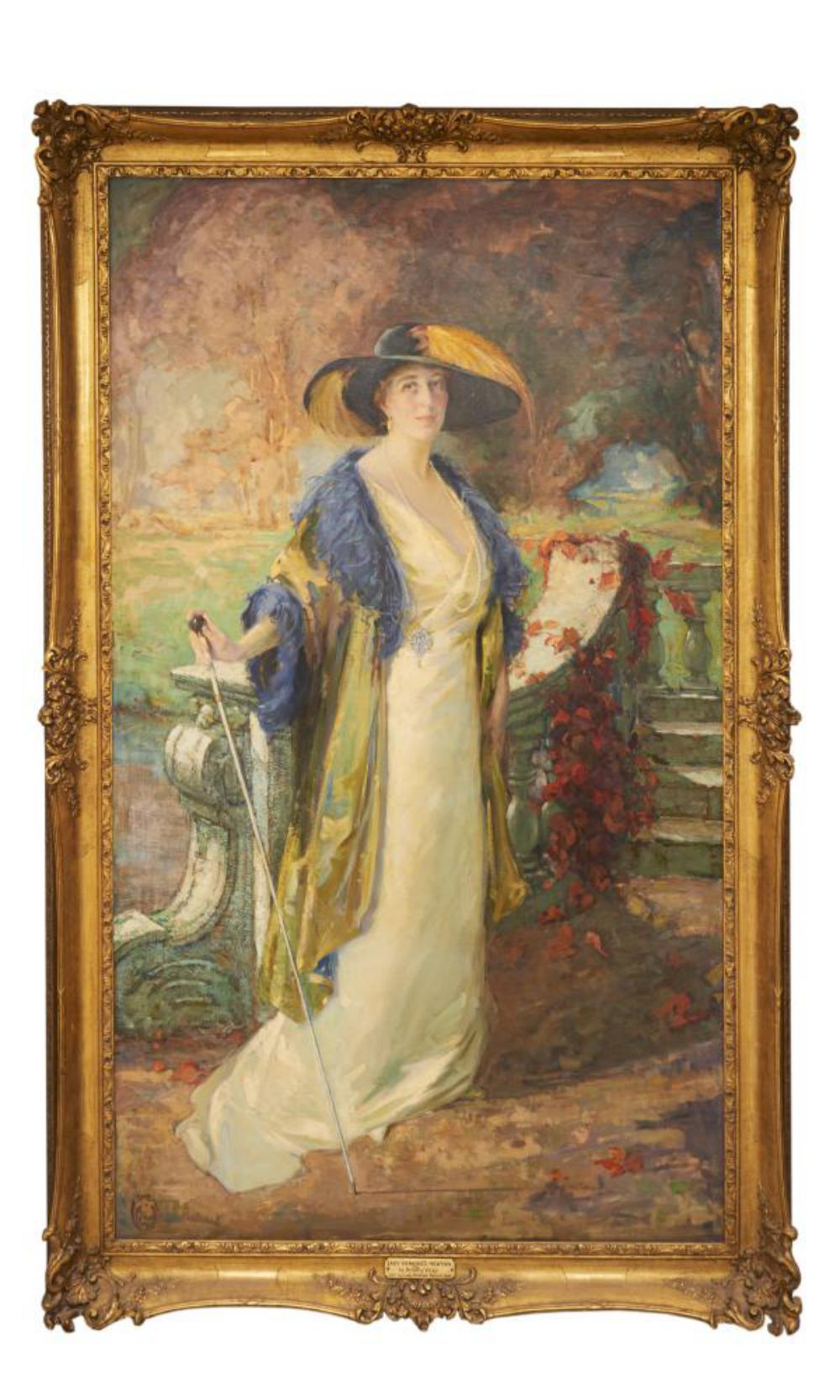
Catherine Mary Sermonda Henniker Heaton, wife of the 2nd Baronet, painted by Dorothy Elaine Vicaji

- Sir John Henniker Heaton, 1st Baronet (1848–1914)
- Sir John Henniker-Heaton, 2nd Baronet (1877–1963)
- Sir (John Victor) Peregrine Henniker-Heaton, 3rd Baronet (1903–1971)
- Sir Yvo Robert Henniker-Heaton, 4th Baronet (born 1954)

The heir apparent is the present holder's son Alastair John Henniker-Heaton (born 1990).

Baronetage of the United Kingdom
Preceded by David baronets	Heaton baronets of Mundarrah Towers; 31 January 1912	Succeeded by Barwick baronets
