= Jessica Harrison-Hall =

British sinologist

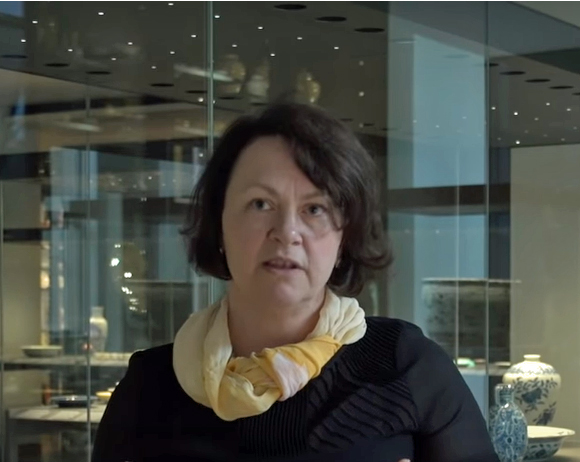
Jessica Harrison-Hall at the British Museum in Gallery 95, the Sir Percival David Collection of Chinese Ceramics.

Jessica Lucy Kilgour Harrison-Hall FSA (Chinese: 霍吉淑; pinyin: Huò jí shū; born 1965) is a British art historian, sinologist, curator and author. She is Keeper of the Department of Asia, and Curator of the Sir Percival David Collection at the British Museum. She researches, lectures and writes about Chinese history and its global connections through visual and material culture.

== Biography ==
Harrison-Hall has an MA in Chinese and fine art from Edinburgh University (1987, including a year at the Chinese Language Department of University of Shandong in Jinan 1984–1985). She completed a PhD from the University of East Anglia in 2025.

In 1991, Harrison-Hall joined the British Museum as a project curator for Jessica Rawson in the Department of Oriental Antiquities (now department of Asia). She became Curator of Chinese Ceramics in 1994, curator of the Sir Percival David Collection in 2006, and Head of the China Section in 2015. She was President of the Oriental Ceramics Society from 2015 to 2018. She is the recipient of two major Arts and Humanities Research Council (AHRC) awards: "Ming Courts and Contacts 1400-1450" project (with (Craig Clunas) (2012) and "Cultural Creativity in Qing China 1796-1912" (with Julia Lovell) (2020).

She is married to the writer and filmmaker Martin Keady with whom she has three children.

== Exhibitions and galleries ==
- 2023 - "China's Hidden Century, 1796-1912" at the British Museum
- 2017 - The Sir Joseph Hotung Gallery of China and South Asia
- 1994 - "Ancient Chinese Trade Ceramics" staged at the National History Museum in Taipei.
- 2014 - "Ming: Fifty Years that Changed China"
- 2009-2012 - "China: Journey to the East" - a travelling exhibition, working with seven UK museums (Bristol City Museum & Art Gallery; The Herbert, Coventry, Willis Museum, Basingstoke; Museum and Winter Gardens, Sunderland; York City Gallery; Manchester Museum; Sheffield Museums Weston Park., accompanied by Harrison-Hall's children book Pocket Timeline of China (2007)
- 2000 - "Vietnam: Behind the Lines: Images of War 1965-75" - the first exhibition in the West to examine Northern Vietnamese artists work from the American-Vietnam war.

== Awards and honours ==
- 2017 Book Prize Specialist Publication Accolade - Awarded by the International Convention of Asia Scholars for (eds.) Ming China: Courts and Contacts 1400-1450, jointly edited with Craig Clunas, Jessica Harrison-Hall and Yu-ping Luk (2016). The book was described by the judges as 'An outstanding connective history in pursuit of China's historical difference’

== Selected publications ==
- China's 1800s: Material and Visual Culture (2024) ISBN 978-0861592418 (edited volume)
- China's Hidden Century: 1796-1912 (2023) ISBN 978-0714124933 (co-edited with Julia Lovell)
- Creators of Modern China: 100 Lives from Empire to Republic 1796–1912 (2023) ISBN 978-0500480809 (co-edited with Julia Lovell)
- China: A History in Objects, Thames and Hudson, London, 2017. ISBN 978 0 5005 1970 7. Italian and Portuguese translations (2018); Chinese (Taiwan), Chinese (China), Korean translations (2019-2020)
- Ming China: Courts and Contacts 1400-1450 (2016) (Co edited with Craig Clunas and Yu-ping Luk) ISBN 978 0 8615 9205 0
- Ming: 50 years that changed China, British Museum Publications, London, 2014 (Co edited with Craig Clunas) ISBN 978 0 7141 2477 3
- Ming: Art, People and Places, British Museum Publications, London, 2014. ISBN 978 0 7141 2483 4
- Passion for Porcelain: Masterpieces of Ceramics from the British Museum and the Victoria and Albert Museum, (co-authors Luisa Mengoni, Hilary Williams, Aileen Dawson), National Museum of China, Beijing, (2012) Lu Zhangshen (ed.) ISBN 978 7 5398 5790 9 (Chinese and English)
- Chinese Ceramics: Highlights of the Sir Percival David Collection, (co-author Regina Krahl), London, 2009 ISBN 978 0 7141 2454 4 (translated into Chinese)
- Vietnam: Behind the Lines - Images from the War 1965-75, British Museum Publications, London, 2002. ISBN 0 7141 1497 9.
- Ming Ceramics - A Catalogue of the late Yuan and Ming Ceramics in the British Museum, British Museum Publications, London, 2001. ISBN 0 7141 1488 X. Translated as Catalogue of Ming Ceramics in the British Museum. Volumes 1 and 2 / 大英博物館藏中國明代陶瓷, Beijing 2014 ISBN 978 7 5134 0614 7
