= Percival David =

British financier, scholar and collector of Chinese ceramics (1892–1964)

Percival David

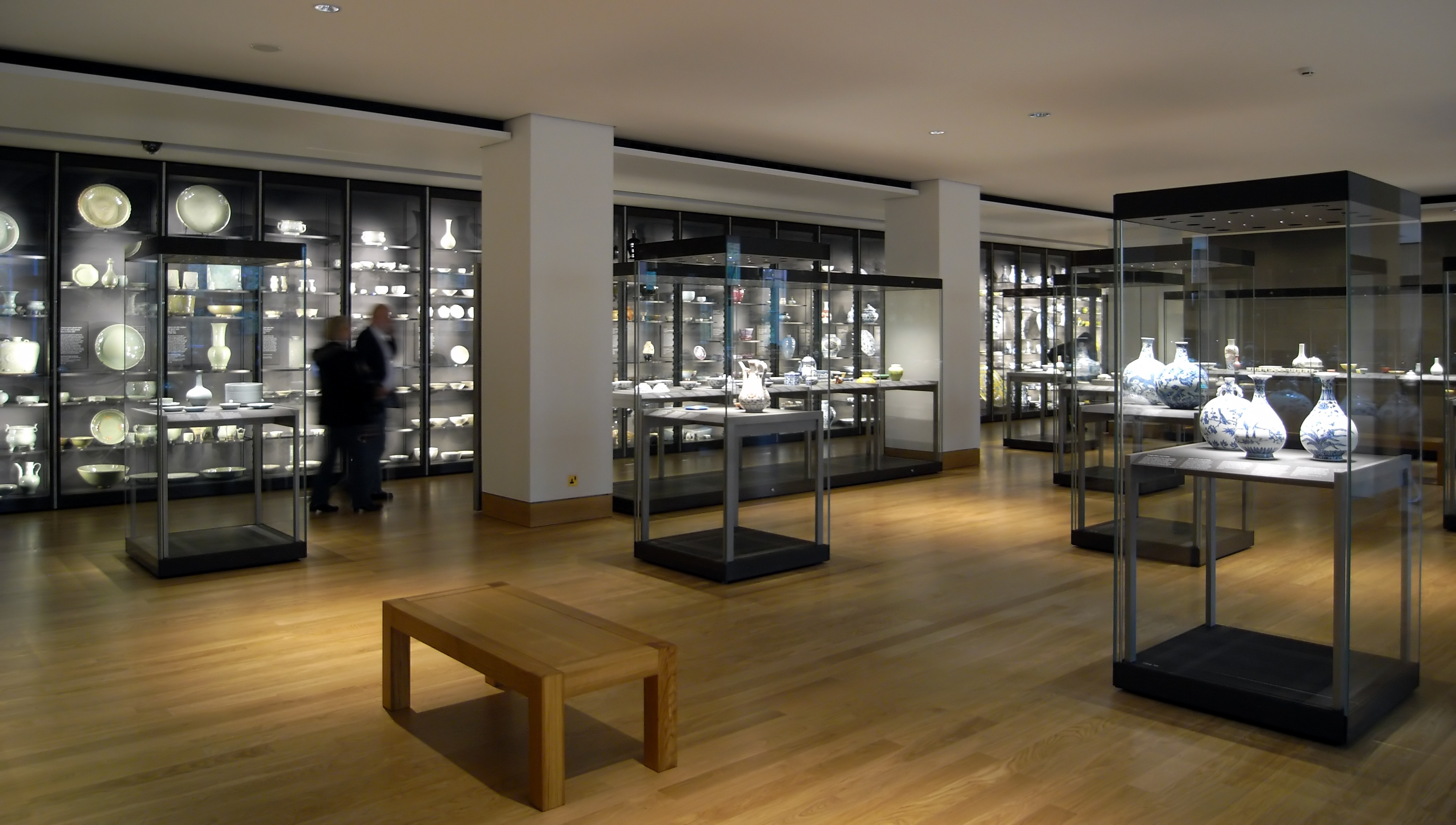
Room 95, British Museum

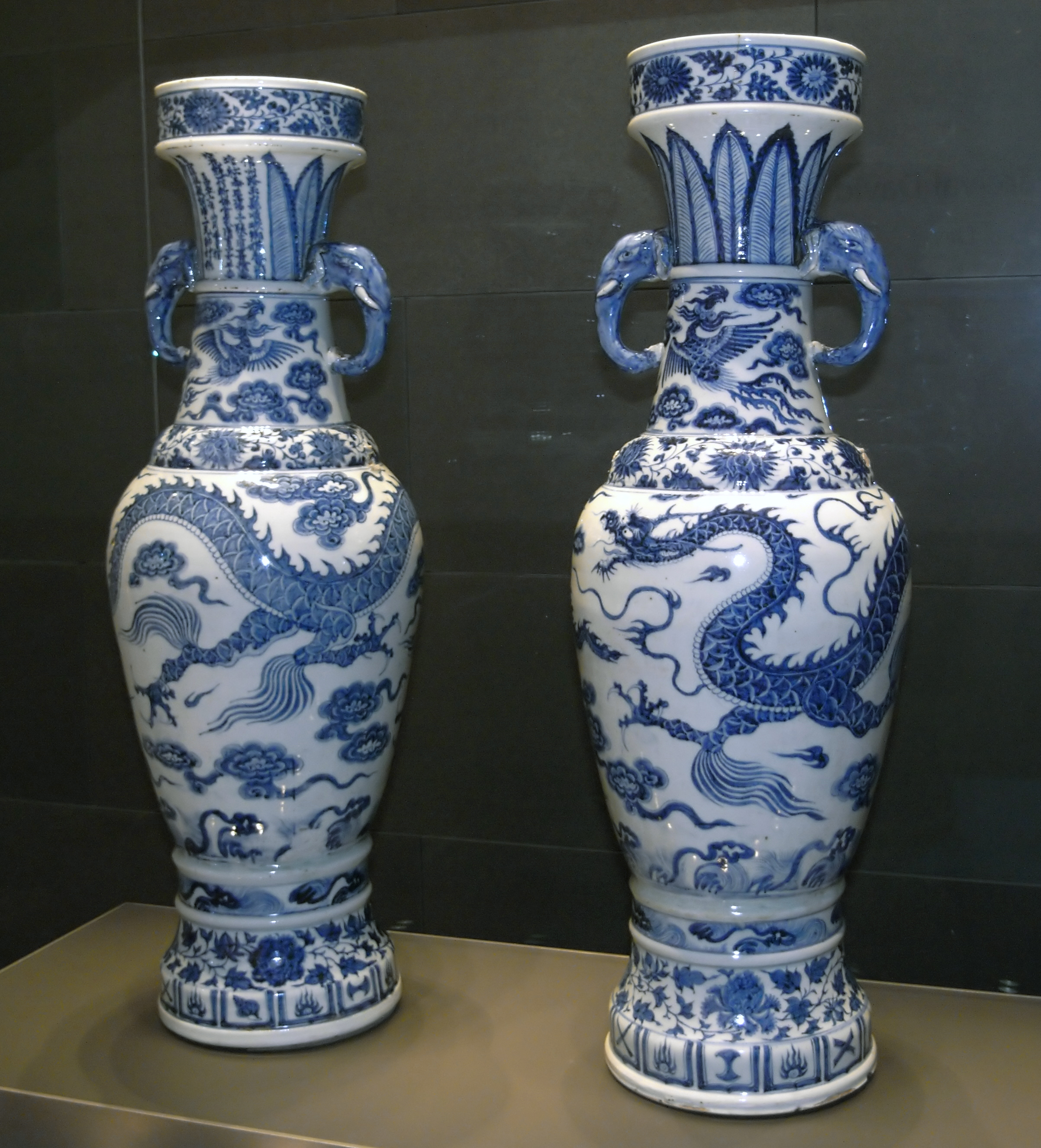
The David Vases, two of the best-known Chinese porcelains in the world, part of the Percival David Foundation of Chinese Art collection

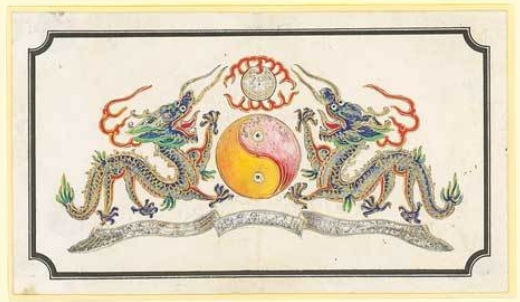
An unadopted hand-drawn essay for the 1878–83 Large Dragon stamps of China once in Percival David's collection

Sir Percival Victor David Ezekiel David, 2nd Baronet (21 July 1892 – 9 October 1964) was a Bombay-born British financier who is best known as a scholar and collector of Chinese ceramics. His collection of Chinese ceramics in the Percival David Foundation of Chinese Art is regarded as the world's most important single collection outside of the palace collections in China and Taiwan. He also formed a collection of Chinese stamps and postal history that has been evaluated as one of the greatest ever assembled.

== Early life ==
David was born in Bombay into a Jewish family in British India that originated in Baghdad. His father, Sir Sassoon David, 1st Baronet, founded the Bank of India.

He was educated in India at Elphinstone College and the University of Bombay, and then at the University of London (D. Lit.).

== Personal life ==
David married in 1912, and Sheila Yorke Hardy was his second wife

He married in 1920, in London, and inherited his father's baronetcy in 1926. After the death of the previous owner in 1919, he bought and lived in Friar Park, the eccentric Victorian neo-Gothic mansion in Henley-on-Thames, later owned by George Harrison of the Beatles.

He funded the excavation of the southern tomb in Seobongchong (서봉총) and visited there in 1929. Seobongchong are two old tombs of Silla kingdom at Gyeongju, South Korea. But the excavation was processed by Japanese scholars because Korea was a Japanese colony in 1920s. So, they named the tomb 'David chong'(David-tomb), but present Korean scholars call it Seobongchong nambun (서봉총 남분, southern tomb in Seobongchong).

== Career ==
David was a financier and the chairman of Sassoon, J. David and Co Ltd., in Bombay.

== Chinese ceramics ==
David started collecting Chinese art some time around 1913 and continued until his death in 1964. The first items he collected were four pieces of Chinese ceramics bought from dealers. David also began to study the Chinese language. He first visited China in 1924, where he studied and collected Chinese ceramics. He made several further trips, including in 1927 when he acquired 40 imperial pieces. He devoted significant part of his life to their study and collection. He joined the Oriental Ceramic Society in 1930 and then sponsored exhibitions, including the International Exhibition of Chinese Art at the Royal Academy in London in 1935. He translated the Ge Gu Yao Lun, a fourteenth century Ming period manual by Cao Zhao. This was published as Chinese Connoisseurship: The Ko Ku Yao Lun, The Essential Criteria of Antiquities. (Faber and Faber, 1971).

The Percival David Foundation of Chinese Art is his collection of Chinese ceramics and related items in London. The Foundation's main purpose is to promote the study and teaching of Chinese art and culture. The Collection consists of some 1,700 pieces of Song, Yuan, Ming and Qing ceramics, mostly porcelain, from the 10th century to the 18th, "high-quality Chinese-taste Song, Ming and Qing ceramics", as the British Museum puts it. It concentrates on the ceramics made for the imperial court, and includes examples of the rare Ru and Guan wares and two important Yuan dynasty blue and white porcelain temple vases (the "David Vases") the oldest dated blue and white porcelain objects, from 1351 A.D.

It also holds a large library of Western and East Asian books related to Chinese art. In 1950 the collection was presented to the University of London and until 2007 was displayed in a house in Gordon Square. Since 2009 it has been shown in a separate gallery, Room 95, at the British Museum, where it is on long-term loan. Percival had already donated several pieces to the British Museum.

== Philately ==
David built a collection of Chinese stamps and postal history that is thought to be one of the greatest ever created. The collection, which included material that David acquired from John A. Agnew (died 1939), was sold by Robson Lowe between 1964 and 1975, with many items entering the collection of the Japanese philatelist Meiso Mizuhara. David joined the Royal Philatelic Society London in 1939 and subsequently became a fellow of that society. Some of his China essays and proofs were displayed in New York in 1947.

== Honours and arms ==
David was an officer of the Legion d'Honneur; F.S.A., F.R.A.I., F.R.S.A., Hon. Advisor 1928–29 National Palace Museums (Beijing); Governor of School of Oriental and African Studies (SOAS), University of London; Director of the International Exhibition of Chinese Art, 1935–6.

Coat of arms of Percival David

Crest
A harp Or between two branches of olive slipped Proper.
Escutcheon
Or a lion dormant Azure on a chief of the last two triangles interlaced between on the dexter a harp and on the sinister a lily leaved and slipped all of the first.
Motto
Deus Pastor Meus

== Death and legacy ==
David died on 9 October 1964 after which the baronetcy became extinct.

Sir Percival and Lady David are commemorated at SOAS in the Percival David Foundation on Torrington Square and the Lady David Gallery on Gordon Square.

Baronetage of the United Kingdom
Preceded by Sassoon David	Baronet (of Bombay); 1926–1964	Extinct
