= Xing ware =

Type of Chinese ceramics

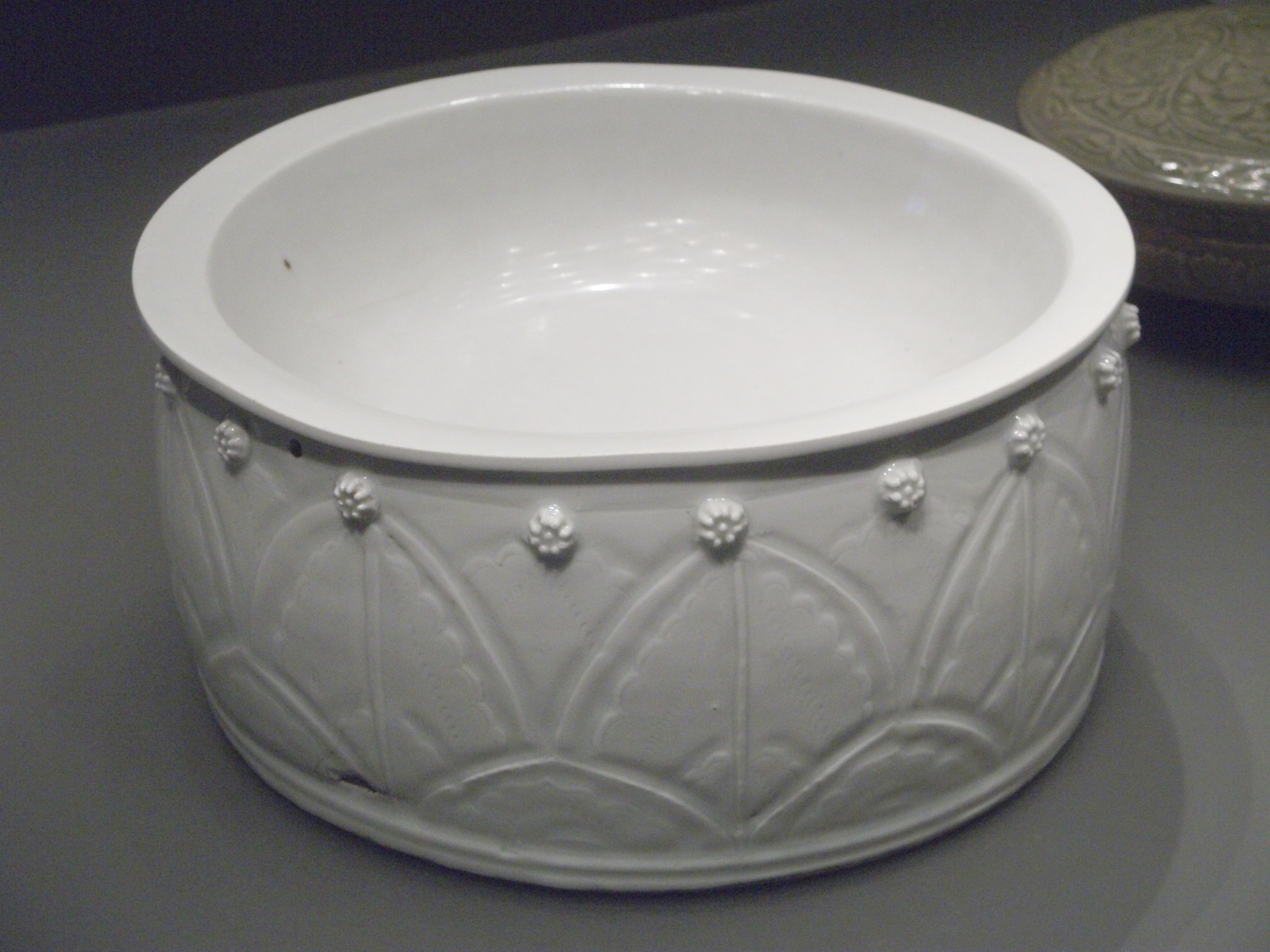
Tang dynasty xing ware, Percival David collection

Xing ware or Xingyao (simplified Chinese: 邢窑; traditional Chinese: 邢窯; pinyin: Xíngyáo) is a type of Chinese ceramics produced in Hebei province in north China, most notably during the Tang dynasty. Xing ware typically has a white body covered with a clear glaze. It was named after Xingzhou in southern Hebei where it was made; kilns sites have been identified in Neiqiu County as well as in Lincheng although Lincheng was not part of Xingzhou during the Tang dynasty.

Some Xing wares were fired at a high enough temperature to be considered porcelain by Western definition, therefore Xing ware may be considered the world's first true porcelain. Xing ware was produced from the Northern Qi to the Song dynasty, and its production reached it peak during the Tang dynasty. It was supplanted by Ding ware during the Song dynasty

== History ==
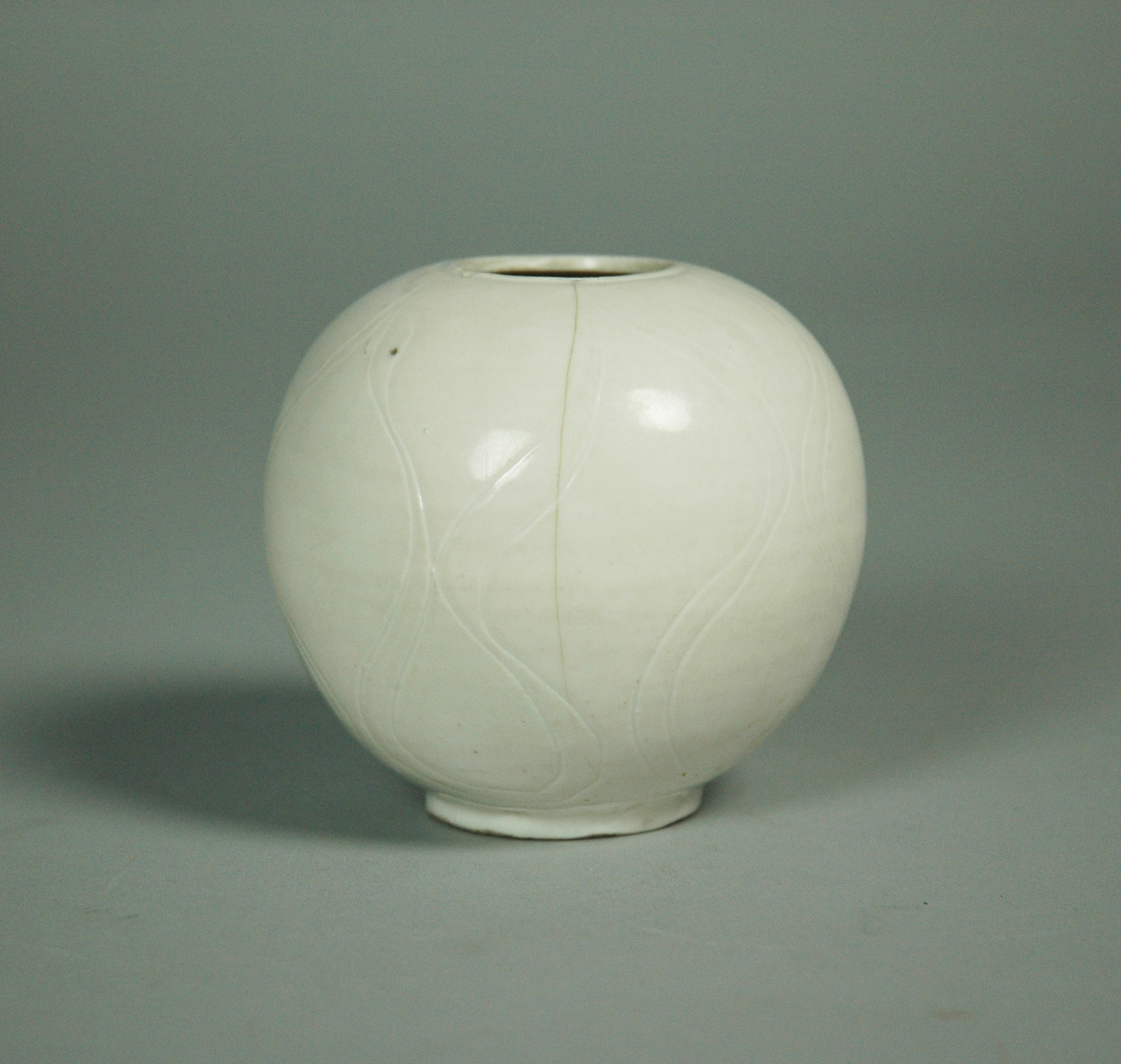
Xing ware used in the courts in the 10th century

White ceramics began to be made in the Xing kilns of northern China during the Northern dynasties period. The early wares were coarser but improvements were made and the finest of these wares were made during the Tang dynasty. Xing ware was used at the Tang court; sherds of white ceramics bearing the Ying (盈, referring to one of the imperial storehouses) or Hanlin (翰林) marks were found at the site of Daming Palace as well as the kiln sites where they were made. A few in Xingtai have the Guan (官, official) mark. In the Tang dynasty treatise on tea, The Classic of Tea, Lu Yu contrasted the white Xing ware with the green Yue ware of Southern China, and compared the colours of Xing ware to those of snow and silver. The white ware became associated with the north while the green ware was associated with the south. The Tang scholar Li Zhao wrote that the Xing ware of Neiqiu was used by the rich and the poor alike, suggesting that there were both fine and coarse types of Xing ware. Xing ware was exported to the outside world during the Tang dynasty. Pieces of Xing ware have been found in the Belitung shipwreck, and examples of Xing ware were found commonly enough in Iraq to be referred to as the "Samarra-type".

Ding ware produced in the nearby area of Dingzhou appeared to have started by imitating Xing ware during the Tang dynasty. It may be difficult to distinguish white Ding ware from Xing ware, although Xing ware may have a colder bluer tone through its transparent glaze. Ding ware began to eclipse Xing ware during the Five Dynasties, and by the Song dynasty, Ding kilns had replaced Xing as the renown producers of ceramics of northern China.

The locations that produced Xing ware were not identified until 1980 and 1981 when kiln sites were excavated at Ciqun in Lincheng County. Later series of excavations have also identified many kiln sites in Neiqiu and Xingtai.

== Production ==
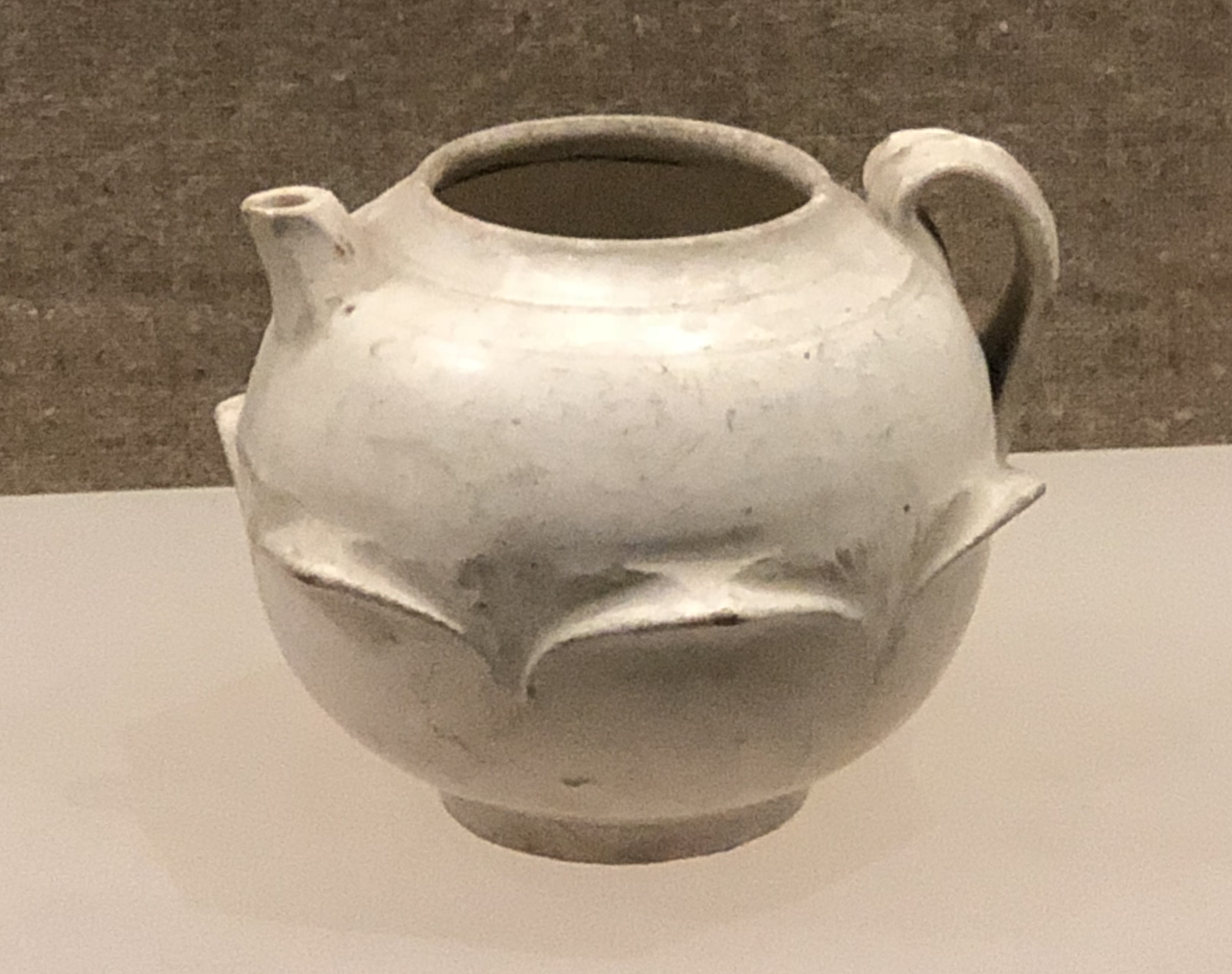
A pot with lotus flower design, Five Dynasties period

The white body of Xing ware may be thinly potted, and fine enough to not require the application of a slip to hide any imperfection or coarseness. The coarser type of Xing ware, however, may have a layer of white slip. The body is usually covered with a thin colourless glaze, but often the glazes of Xing ware have a bluish tinge. The glaze contained magnesium oxide and phosphorus pentoxide, which reduce glaze dripping and cracking, and give it a whiter and smoother appearance. Xing ware is primarily white, although some early pieces with green glaze, and other later pieces with yellow or black glazes as well as sancai have been found.

The Xing kilns were fired with wood rather than coal. Saggars were used to protect the wares during firing. The pieces were fired at a temperature high enough to approach that required for the production of porcelain, although Xing wares are often not quite vitrified enough to produce the glassy or translucent appearance of true porcelain. Such Xing ware may be considered stoneware by Western definition, but some pieces are true porcelain. This distinction between stoneware and porcelain, however, is not made in China and it is therefore considered porcelain in Chinese terms.
