= Heicheng =

Heicheng (Chinese: 黑城; lit. 'black city') may refer to these places in China:

- Heicheng Township, a township in Lincheng County, Hebei
- Khara-Khoto, an ancient Tangut city, in Ejin Banner, Alxa League, Inner Mongolia
- Sanhe, Ningxia, formerly Heicheng, a town in Haiyuan County, Ningxia
