= Cizhou ware =

Type of Chinese ceramics

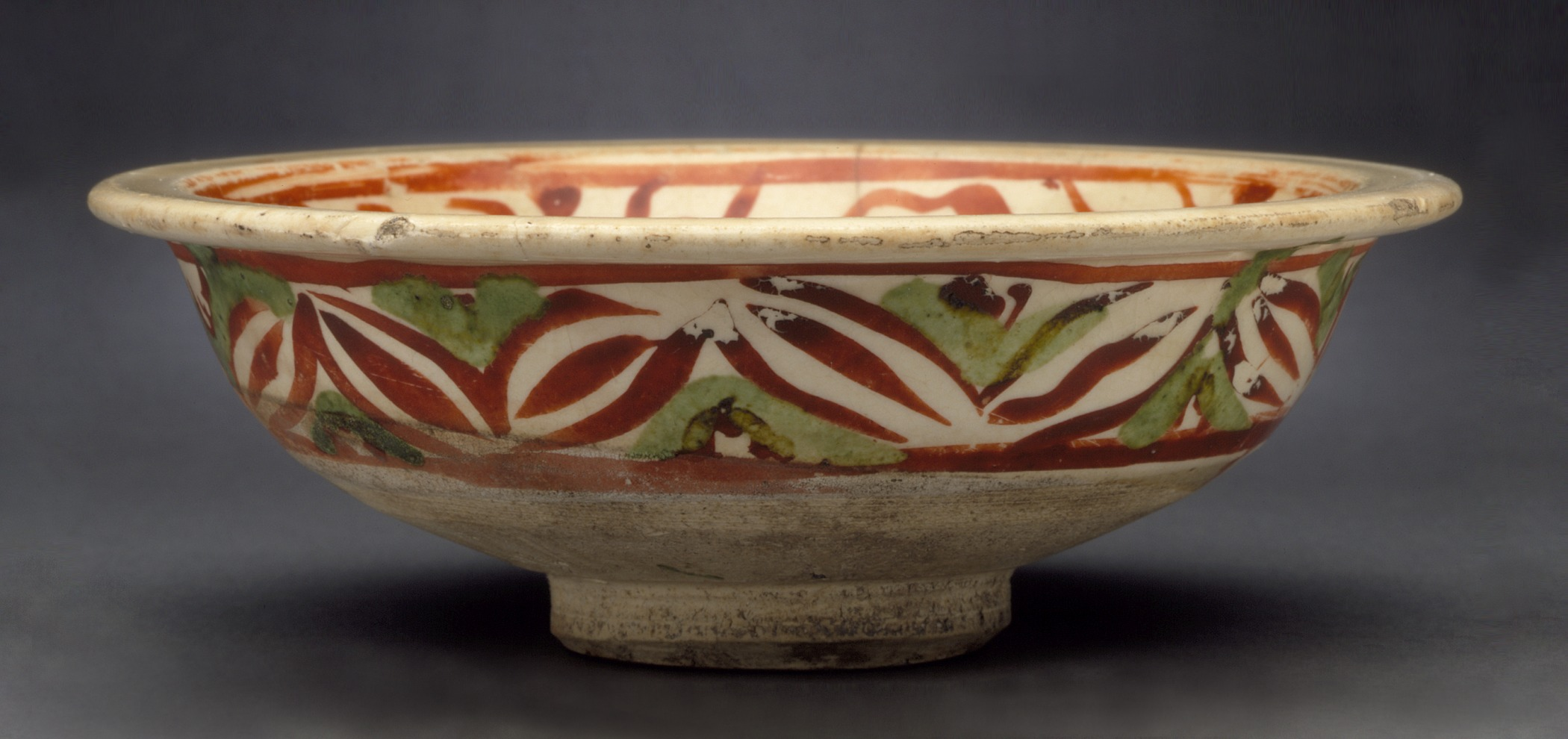
- Cizhou ware bowl with painted red plum spray in overglaze enamel, late Jin or early Yuan dynasty. Los Angeles County Museum of Art.
- Branch: Chinese ceramics
- Years active: Late Tang – Ming dynasty (9th–17th century); peak during Song, Jin, and Yuan
- Location: Ci County and Pengcheng, Hebei (ancient Cizhou); also Henan, Shanxi, Shandong, and other northern provinces
- Influences: Tang sancai, Ding ware
- Influenced: Korean buncheong ware, e-Shino ware, Shanxi and Henan regional kilns

Cizhou ware or Tz'u-chou ware (Chinese: 磁州窯; pinyin: Cízhōu yáo; Wade–Giles: Tz'u-chou yao) is a wide range of Chinese ceramics from between the late Tang dynasty and the early Ming dynasty, but especially associated with the Northern Song to Yuan period in the 11–14th century. It has been increasingly realized that a very large number of sites in northern China produced these wares, and their decoration is very variable, but most characteristically uses black and white, in a variety of techniques. For this reason Cizhou-type is often preferred as a general term. All are stoneware in Western terms, and "high-fired" or porcelain in Chinese terms. They were less high-status than other types such as celadons and Jun ware, and are regarded as "popular", though many are finely and carefully decorated.

Alone among major types of Song ceramics their effect largely depends on decoration in contrasting colours, usually in black on white, but sometimes polychrome. At this time, unlike later periods, ceramics for the court were "relentlessly monochrome", and Cizhou wares are not mentioned in the large quantities of "tribute wares" given from the provinces to the emperor, of which much was redistributed, or perhaps sold; "Confucian esthetics emphasized simplicity."

It was named for Cizhou, a prefecture now called Ci County in Handan in southern Hebei, one of the main centres of production. Most Cizhou ware uses a transparent glaze applied on a white slipped-body, with further decoration chosen from a wide variety of techniques.

== Description ==
The wares are generally sturdy, and often rather large. Many shapes relate to wine-drinking, and ceramic pillows or head-rests are common. The clay bodies fire to a range of off-white, grey and brown shades, varying with location. The main methods of forming used are wheel-throwing and forming from slabs, with moulds sometimes used, mainly for head-rests. Generally a coating of white or, less often, black or brown slip was applied all over to hide this not very attractive body. After decoration a glaze was applied, normally this was transparent but, especially in later periods, green and turquoise glazes were used, including over slip-painting. Additionally, the same kilns often produced wares glazed in black and brown, and less decorated. Conventionally, and perhaps rather artificially, these are not usually classified as Cizhou wares (unless highly decorated) but by such terms as "Northern black wares", or "Northern dark wares". As well as underglaze slip-painting, overglaze enamelling was sometimes used, for the first time in China.

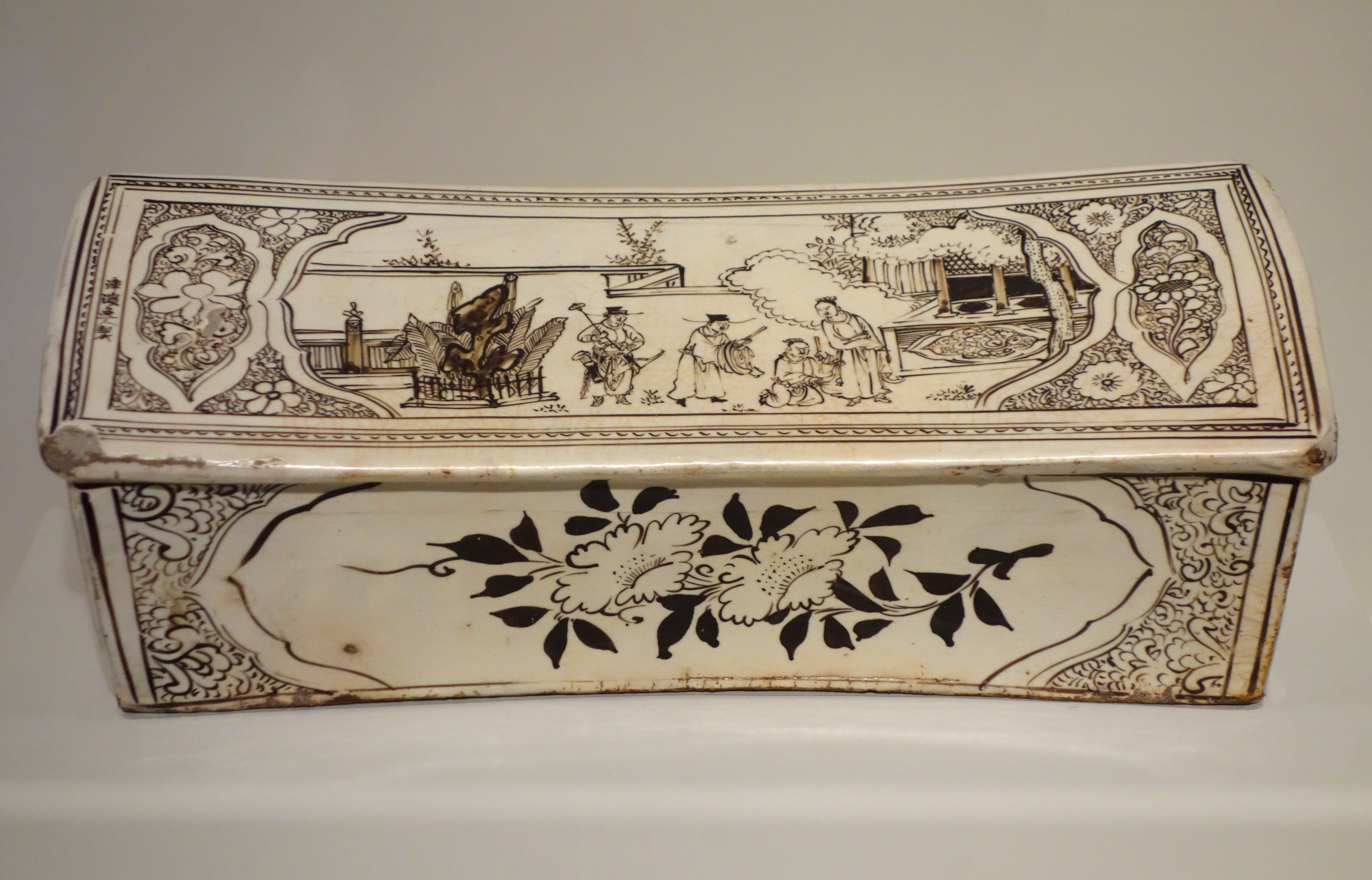
Headrest with a slip-painted scene from popular drama, Yuan dynasty, late 13th century, with inscription in left margin

A very wide range of decorative techniques are used, often in conjunction. The most common and characteristic technique is painting in black or brown slip on top of a layer of white slip. Designs are also formed by a variety of slip-cutting or sgraffito techniques where slip is scratched or cut away to reveal another slip or the body beneath; a vase with carved peony scrolls in Indianapolis uses this technique. Other techniques include the shallow carving common on other Song ceramics such as Ding ware and celadon or greenwares, incising, stamping, and working with a roulette or tool with a ridged wheel. In earlier sgraffito pieces backgrounds are often patterned by "ring-matting", impressing the end of a piece of bamboo through the slip to leave a pattern of circles, a style borrowed from metalwork. Comb-like instruments were also used to make patterns of parallel lines. The subject matter of the decoration is equally varied, and draws from earlier or contemporary work in several media, including pottery, metalwork and Chinese painting, especially the distinct genre of bird-and-flower painting. Flowers, especially the paeony, mallow and lotus, have elegant petals and tendrils arranged in scrolling patterns. Fish and birds are common, often painted with great freedom and life. Human figures may be used, and especially in the large flat space offered by the top of a head-rest, there are sometimes several together, set in a landscape and perhaps showing a scene from literature or legend. There are often painted inscriptions, typically related to drinking on appropriate pieces, wishing good sleep on head-rests, or short poems. More expensive wares are sometimes imitated, including white Ding ware, and in the black wares the special glazing effects of Jian ware tea bowls.

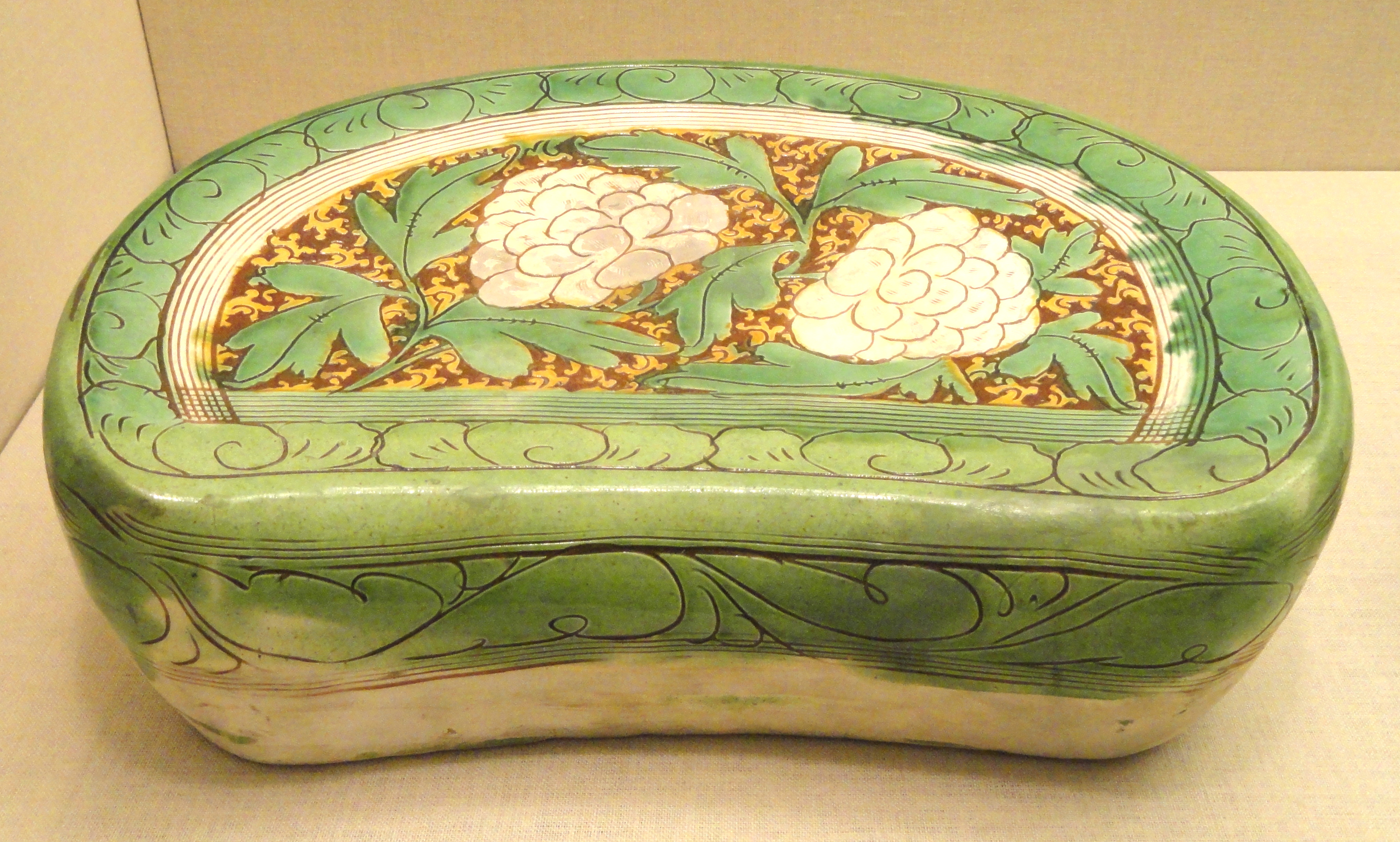
Bean-shaped headrest with coloured glazes and carved and incised decoration, Jin dynasty

Some types of object, including head-rests, are often stamped underneath or inscribed with the name of the potter, or an indication of the date or source of the object, which is generally rare in Chinese pottery. In particular many head-rests, mostly of the 12–13th centuries but perhaps extending from the mid-11th to mid-14th centuries, are stamped with the name of the Zhang (张家) family workshop from Henan. These include the slightly curved box type with flat surfaces for painting, Other kilns made fancy moulded shapes with a flat panel for the head; tigers, presumably for male customers, are common.

Most decoration uses two contrasting colours, but some pieces are polychrome, especially from later periods. Two techniques were used: the first was lead-based glaze colours, in a continuation of Tang dynasty sancai techniques, and the second overglaze enamelling, developed in Cizhou kilns some time around 1200, and seen for the first time on Chinese pottery. This was used on Persian mina'i ware from 1180 or earlier; on metal vitreous enamel had been used around the Mediterranean and in Europe since ancient times. The earliest dated example, in Tokyo, is from 1201.

The main enamel colours are red, yellow and green, and the pieces small bowls, head-rests and small figurines, many probably toys or dolls, but some religious figures and perhaps figures made for tombs, as in earlier periods representing servants for the afterlife. There are also simple vessels with (typically) floral designs in a few colours on a cream background. Overglaze enamelling required a first firing of the glazed body at about 1200 °C or more, followed by a further firing at a lower temperature of about 800°C after the glaze or lead-based enamels had been applied; these would not have given the right colours at a high temperature.

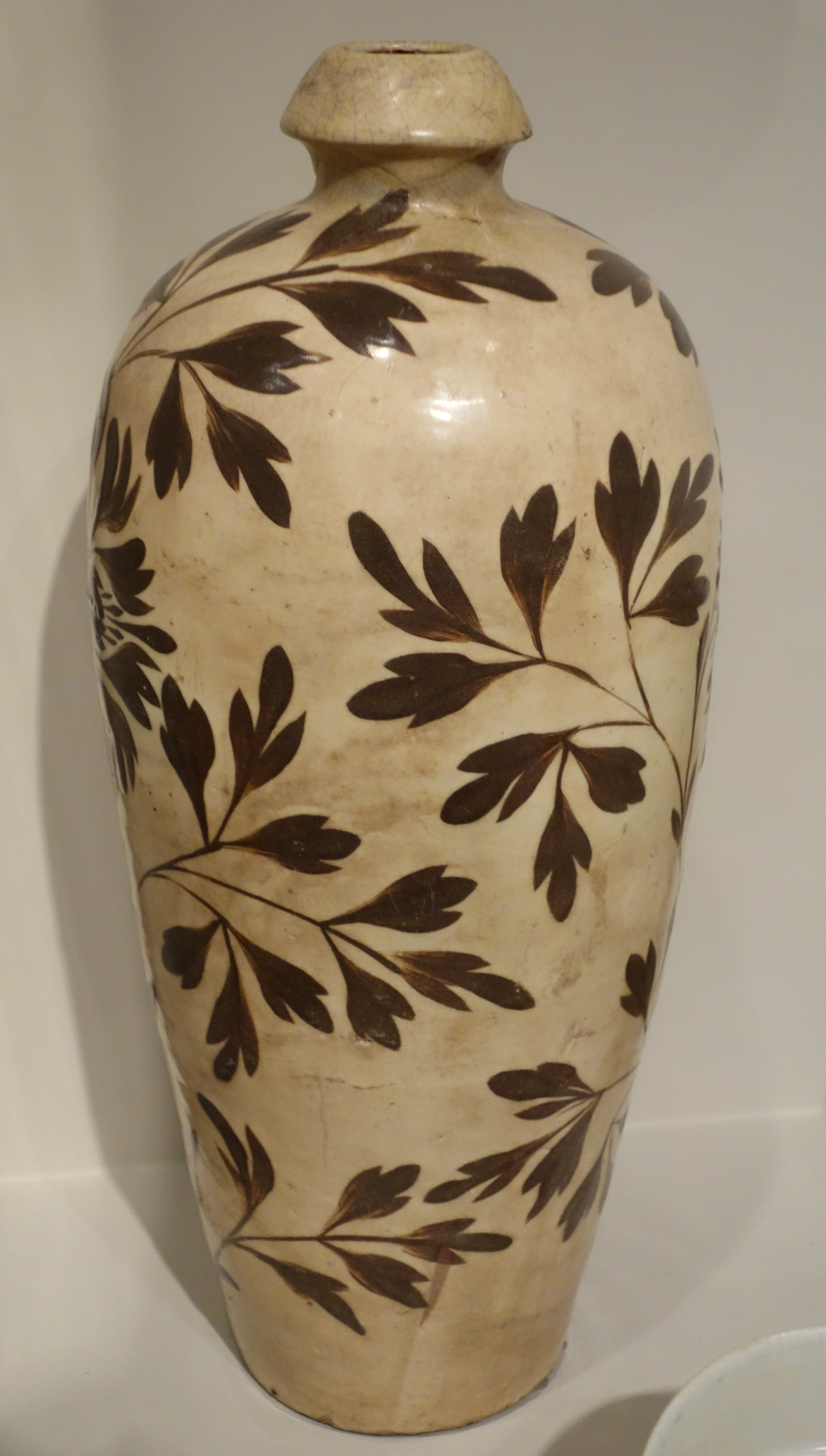
Meiping vase with slip-painted paeony foliage, Jin dynasty, 12th or 13th century

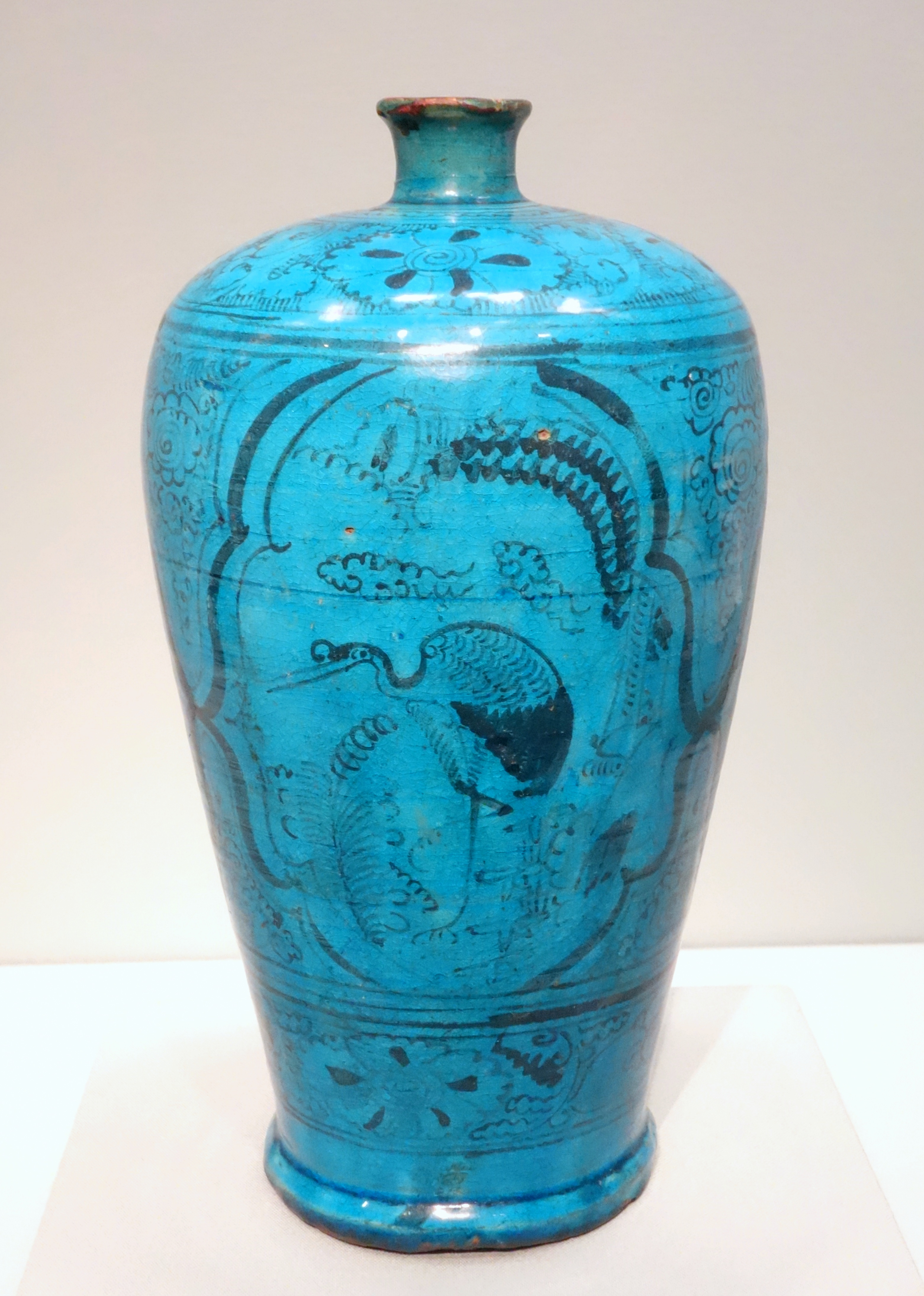
Ming meiping with slip-painted crane under turquoise glaze

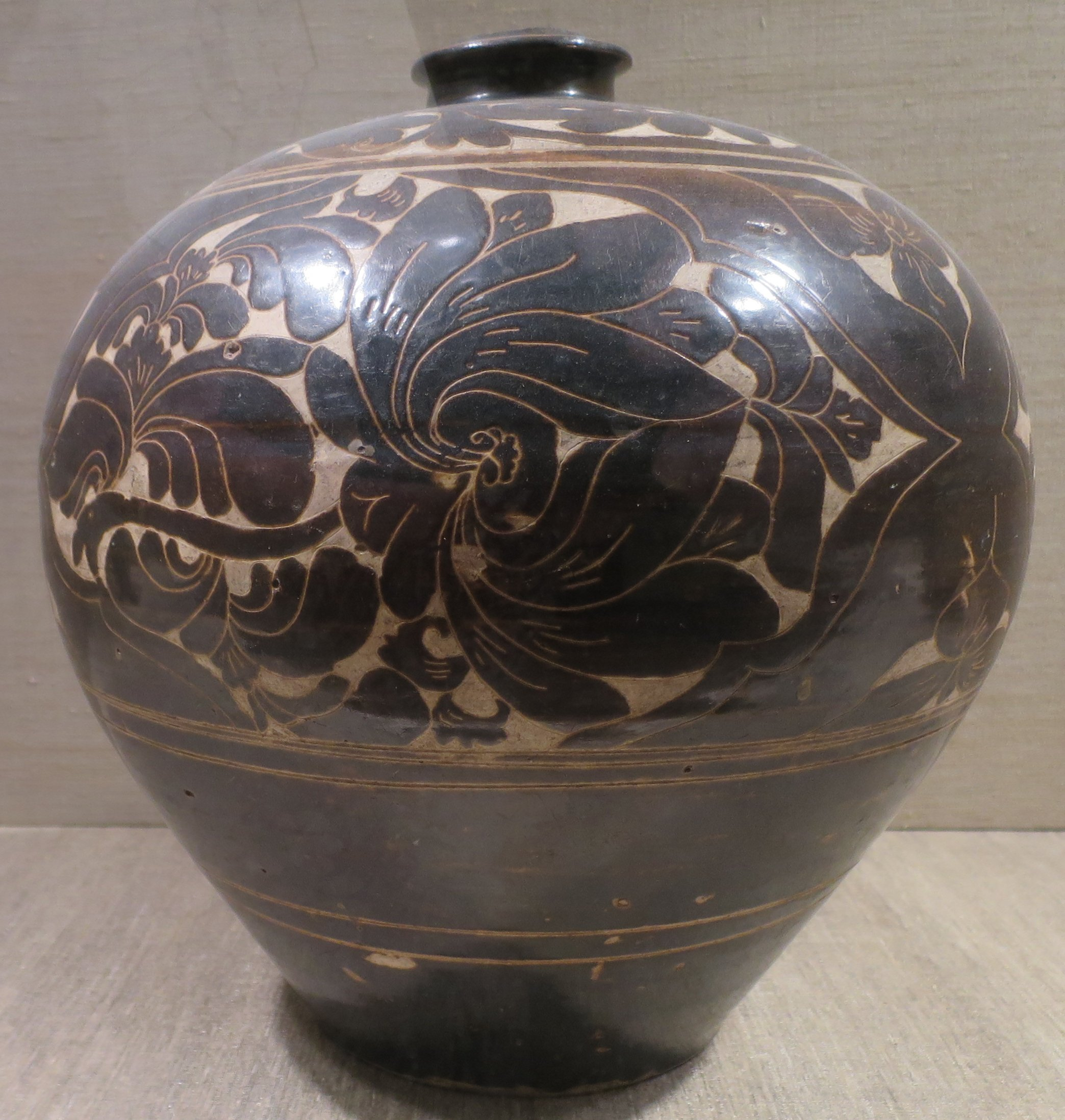
Floral design cut into the slip, 14th century

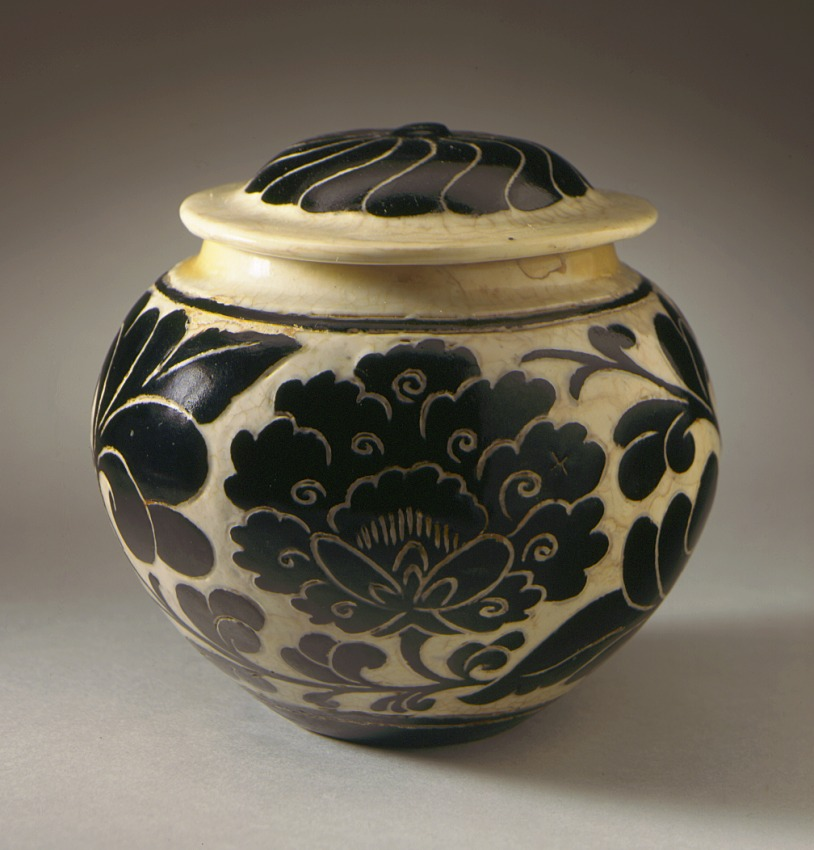
13th-century jar with lid, described as "with cream glaze and wax-resist and carved black overglaze decoration"

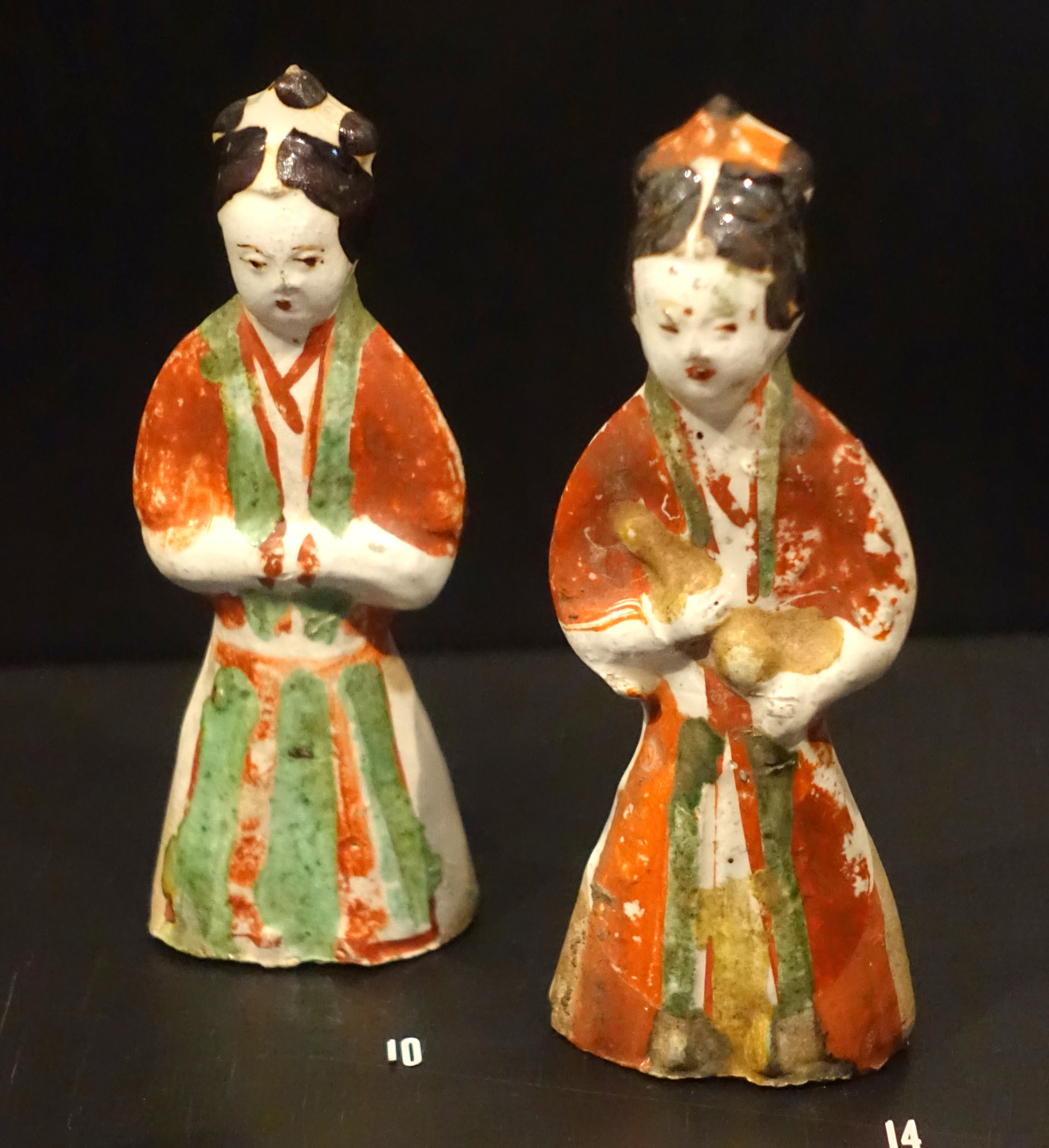
Yuan dynasty figures, probably dolls

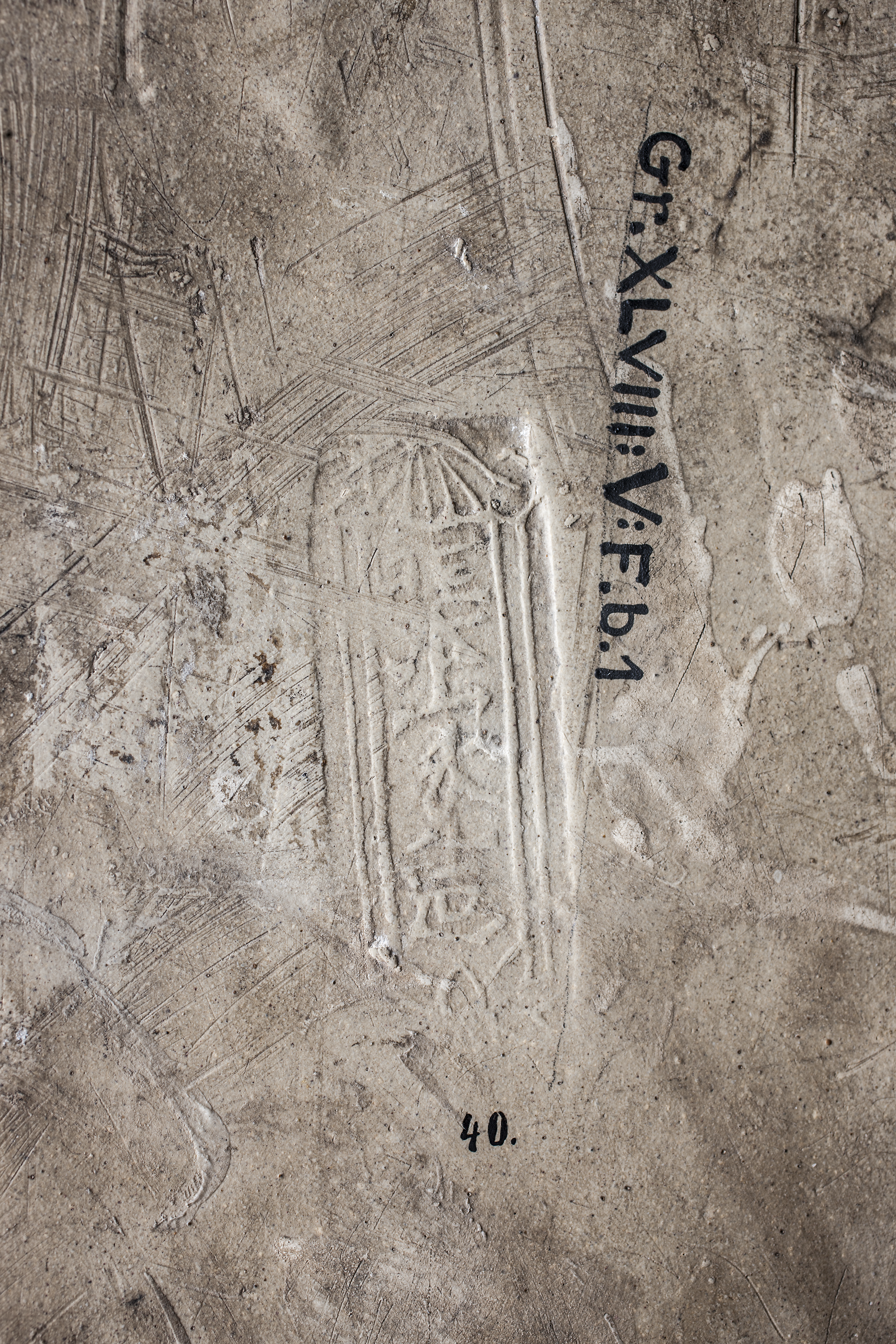
Zhang family stamp (next to later museum number) on a headrest formed as a tiger

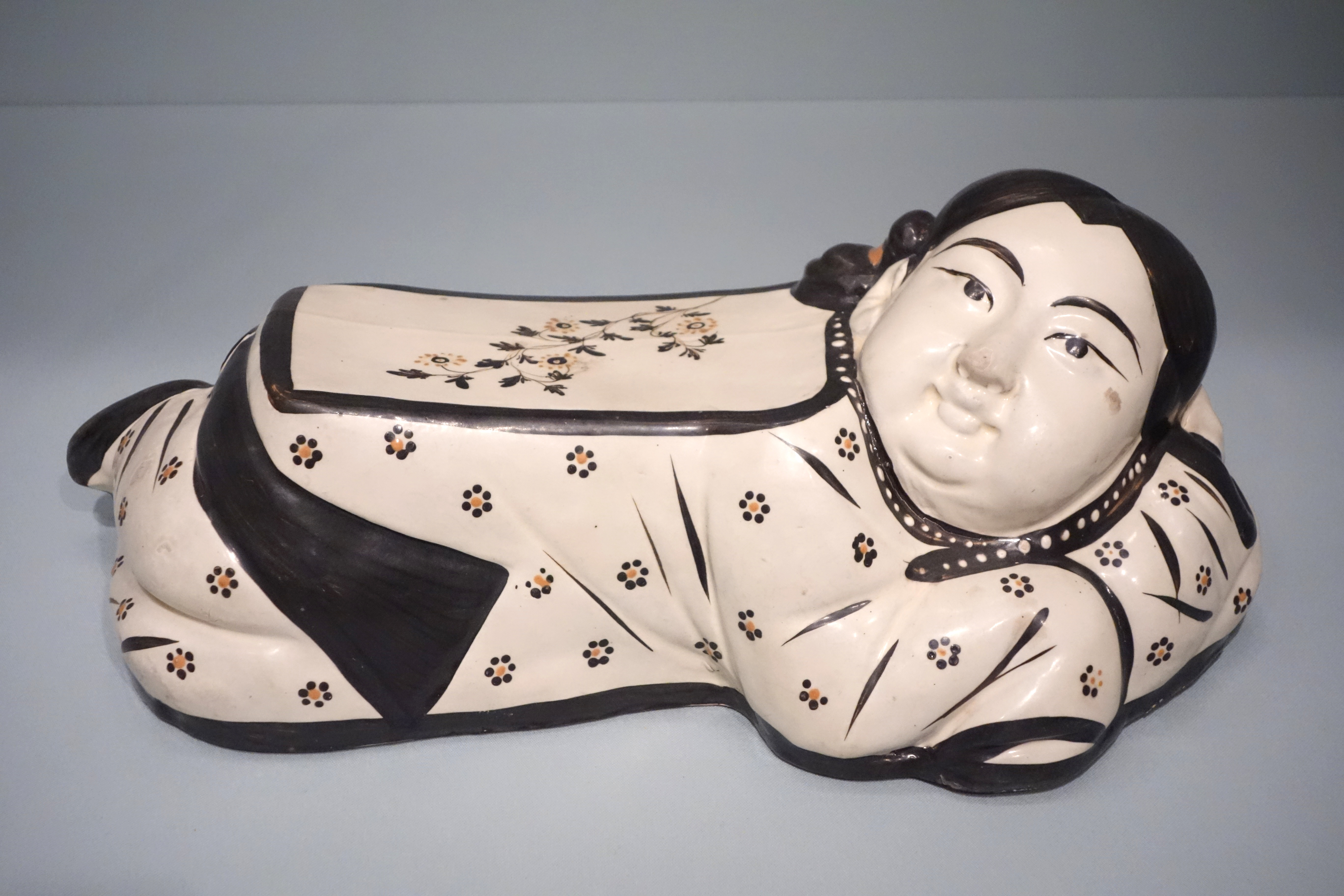
Headrest mould-formed as a girl, Jin dynasty, with overglaze enamels

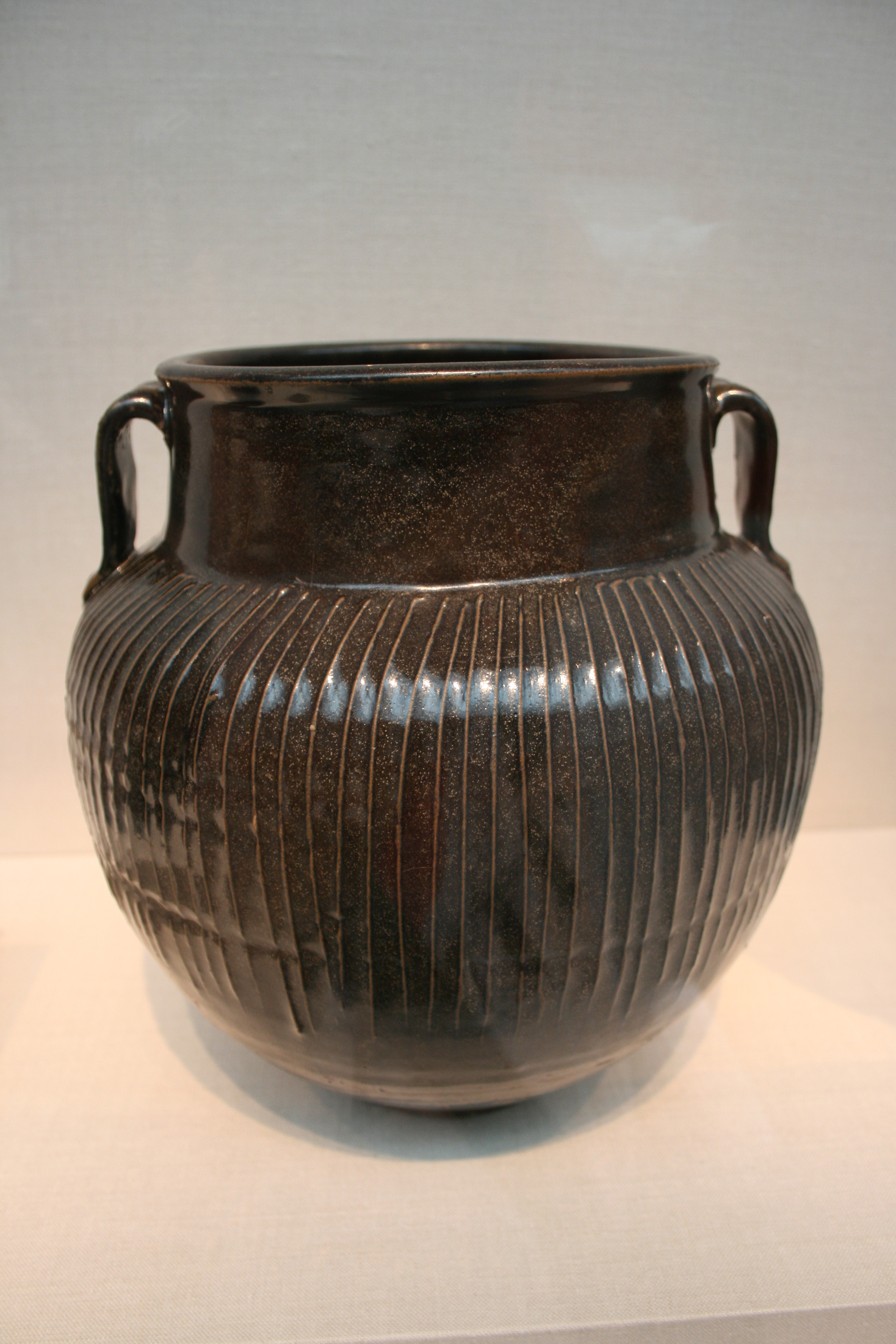
Black vase, with white slip in between the ribs

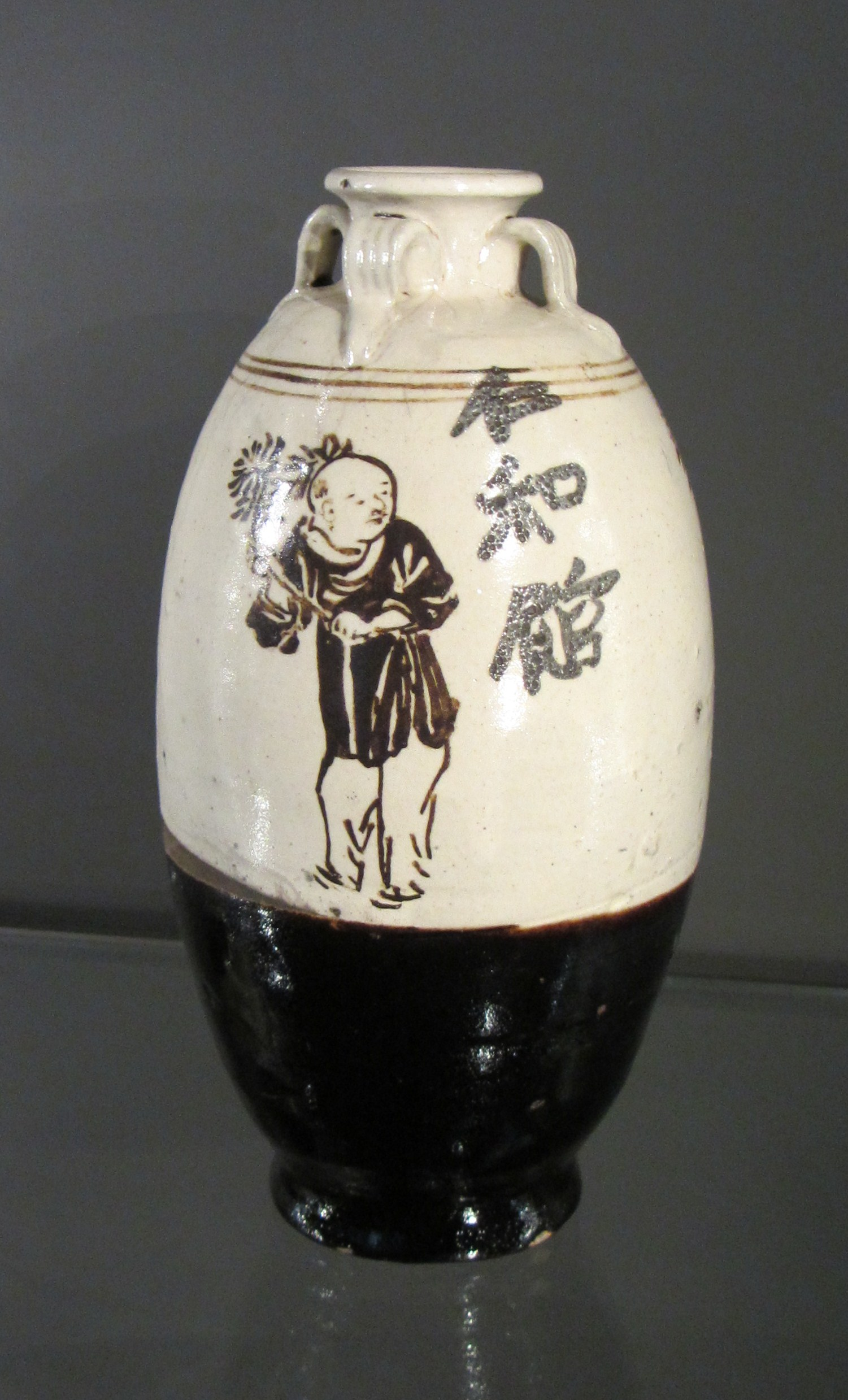
Jin dynasty, iron-pigmented brown slip and cream slip wine bottle with painted boys, inscribed "Benevolence and Harmony Tavern"

== Influence ==
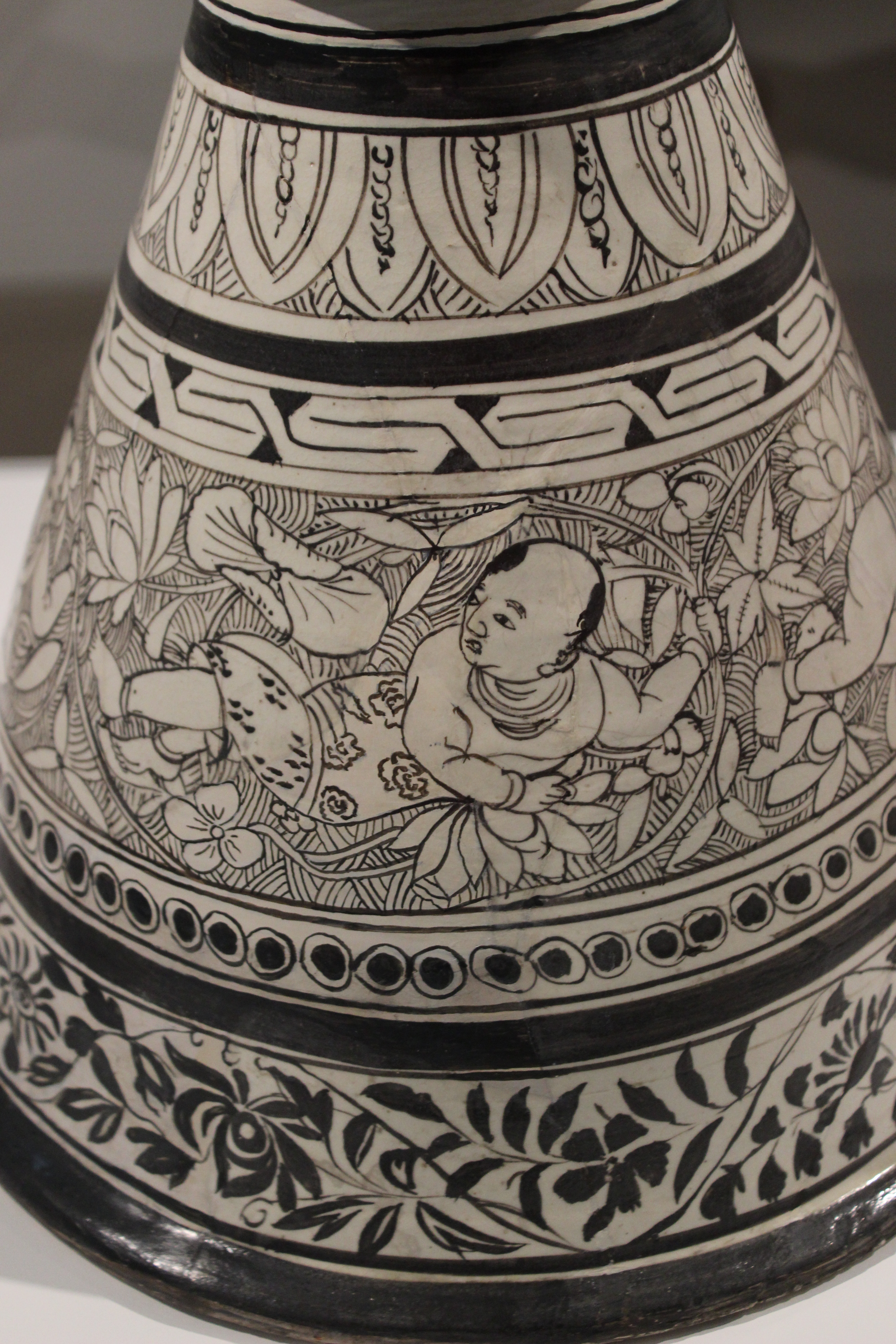
Detail of banded decoration on an unusually elaborate vase, 12–13th century

Although strongly based in the north, some Cizhou-type wares were produced in the south, and the products were very widely distributed across China, even if little was exported. Apparently largely free from the dictates of court or aristocratic taste, the producers were free to experiment with their great variety of techniques and subjects and motifs for decoration. They and their clientele were also less affected by political changes than their equivalents for high-status wares, allowing a development of the wares over many centuries and dynasties with relatively little disruption.

In their emphasis on painted decoration, whether under or over the glaze, Cizhou ware anticipated the style that would, eventually, come to dominate Chinese ceramics, even those for the court. Eventually this would mainly use the Cizhou invention of overglaze enamelling. Another Cizhou development (if one ignores the precedent of ancient Greek vase painting) that would become part of general Chinese, and world, ceramics was decorating tall vessels in wide bands of the main decoration, surrounded by smaller bands of repetitive motifs, or in dishes similar circular borders.

It has been suggested that the movement of potters from Cizhou kilns to the south, especially at the start of the Yuan dynasty, was part of this influence. This may have been either or both by the movement of artisans directly to Jingdezhen, or to kilns making Jizhou ware, which in turn influenced Jingdezhen. The Mongols often forced artists to move locations, and this period saw the beginning of underglaze painted blue and white porcelain from Jingdezhen.
