= Vase with carved peony scrolls =

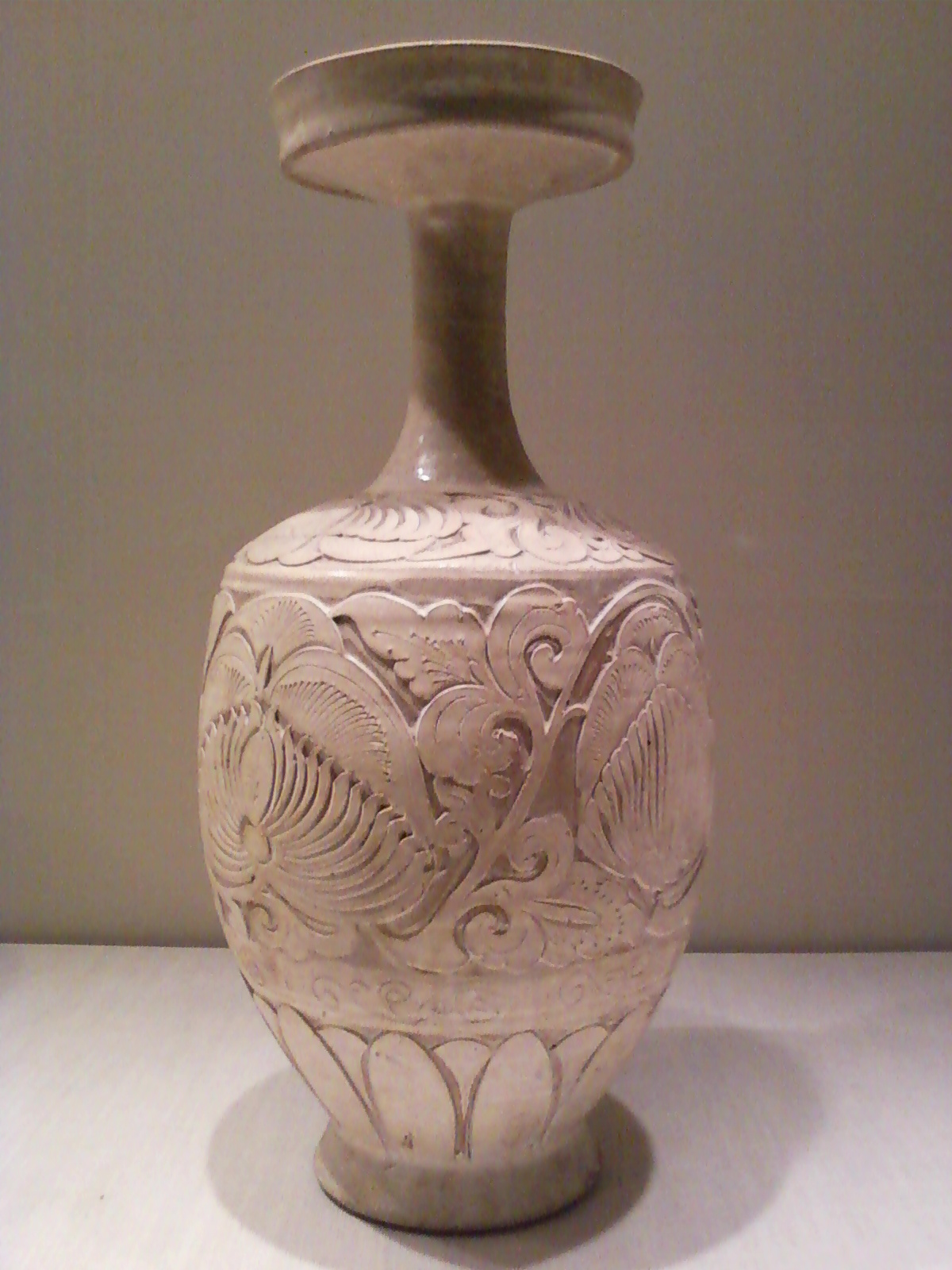
- Artist: Unknown Chinese artist
- Year: 11th century
- Type: Stoneware with slip and clear glaze
- Dimensions: 17 in × 8.5 in (43.2 cm × 21.6 cm)
- Location: Indianapolis Museum of Art; Indianapolis, IN

Vase with carved peony scrolls is a Cizhou-type stoneware vase of the Northern Song dynasty, made about 1100 and now in the Asian collection of the Indianapolis Museum of Art, where it is currently on display in the Richard M. Fairbanks Gallery.

This Cizhou-style, stoneware vase, features a wide, stylish body that was crafted using a white slip and clear glaze overcoat. Rising out of the body is a long, thin neck, topped with a "saucer-shaped mouth." Adorning the central body of the vase is a blend of peony flowers and leaves, with rows of elegant patterns bordering the top and base of the body. Each design was carved deep into the surface of the vase to expose to the dark body beneath the white slip, creating a two-tone color effect and natural shading elements.

== Background ==
The Song dynasty (960–1279) marked a new period of artistic design, with ceramics reaching new levels of perfection and popularity. One such ceramic style known as Cizhou wares, were produced at kilns across northern China, ranging from the Ningxia to Shandong provinces. The name of this style is derived from the largest manufacturing kilns in the Hebei and Henan provinces, which were located in a region known as Cizhou during the Northern Song dynasty, located in present-day Cixian county. Cizhou ceramics were created to withstand continuous daily use and were manufactured in large enough quantities to be accessible to the general populace. As a result, Cizhou-wares have come to be called "the people’s ware." One result of these wares being considered folk art, is that the potters were able to experiment with new techniques and designs, utilizing both glaze and slip processes as well as brush painting designs. This Cizhou vase featured at the Indianapolis Museum of Art serves as an example of a glaze and slip etching technique, while Cizhou-wares created in later periods often featured brush paintings placed directly on the slip with a protective glaze overcoat.

Overall, Cizhou wares have one of the longest histories of all the ceramic styles. This style is noted for having been produced continuously from the 10th century onward, with significant manufacture rates during the Northern Song, Jin, and Yuan dynasties.

== Symbolism ==
Adorning this vase are a series of peonies, a motif that was very common among Chinese artworks. Due to their bold colors and large size, many in China believe the flowers to symbolize royalty and rank. This symbolic association has earned the peony the name fùguìhuā (富贵花), which means "flower of riches and honor." Tree peonies, or those belonging to the woody family, are the versions traditionally found in Chinese art motifs. These peonies are characterized by large red flowers, which has resulted in them often being called the "king of flowers."

During the Sui and Tang Dynasties, the peony was officially introduced into the Chinese imperial gardens. It was not however until royal consort Wu Zetian, who later became the only woman to serve as emperor of China, took an interest in the flower that it gained in popularity. Under her reign, many officials who sought to advance their careers began to show an increased appreciation for the peony, eventually resulting in its widespread acceptance as a flower of wealth and rank.

== Acquisition ==
This piece is listed as being a gift from Mr. and Mrs. Eli Lilly to the Indianapolis Museum of Art. The vase was donated to the museum in 1947.
