= Ding ware =

Type of Chinese ceramics

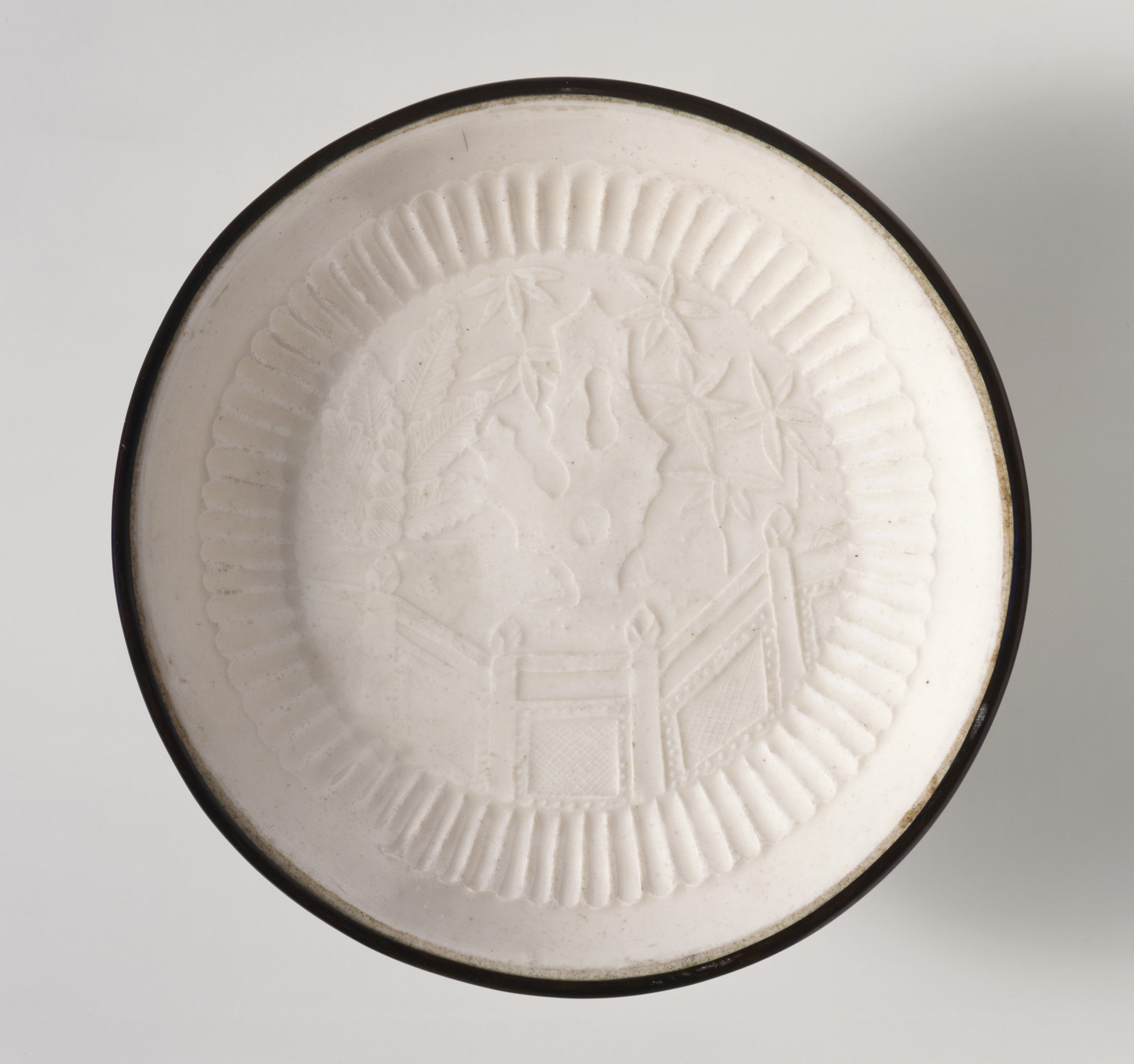
- Ding ware dish (pan) with impressed garden landscape decoration and metal-banded rim, Jin dynasty (13th century), diameter 14 cm. Los Angeles County Museum of Art.
- Branch: Chinese ceramics
- Years active: Tang – Yuan dynasty (8th–14th century); peak during Northern Song
- Location: Quyang County (ancient Dingzhou), Hebei, China
- Influences: Xing ware
- Influenced: Jingdezhen white ware, Jiexiu ware (Shanxi), Korean white porcelain

Ding ware, Ting ware (Chinese: 定瓷; pinyin: Dìngcí) or Dingyao are Chinese ceramics, mostly porcelain, that were produced in the prefecture of Dingzhou (formerly romanized as "Ting-chou") in Hebei in northern China. The main kilns were at Jiancicun or Jianci in Quyang County. They were produced between the Tang and Yuan dynasties of imperial China, though their finest period was in the 11th century, under the Northern Song. The kilns "were in almost constant operation from the early eighth until the mid-fourteenth century."

The most characteristic wares are thin porcelains with a white or greyish body and a nearly transparent white-tinted glaze, though they are classed as stoneware by some. Chemical analysis has shown that they were often made entirely of a kaolinitic clay without any petuntse or "porcelain stone". They are mostly decorated with uncoloured designs that are incised or in very shallow relief.

Ding ware was the most famous northern Chinese white ware under the Song, although there was increasing competition from the Qingbai ware from Jingdezhen in the south, which by the end of the Song had eclipsed Ding ware, achieving a predominance it has maintained in subsequent centuries. A key event in this process was the flight of the remaining Northern Song court to the south, after they lost control of the north in the disastrous Jin-Song wars of the 1120s. A new Southern Song court was based in Hangzhou. This may have been accompanied by the movement of potters to Jingdezhen.

== Wares ==
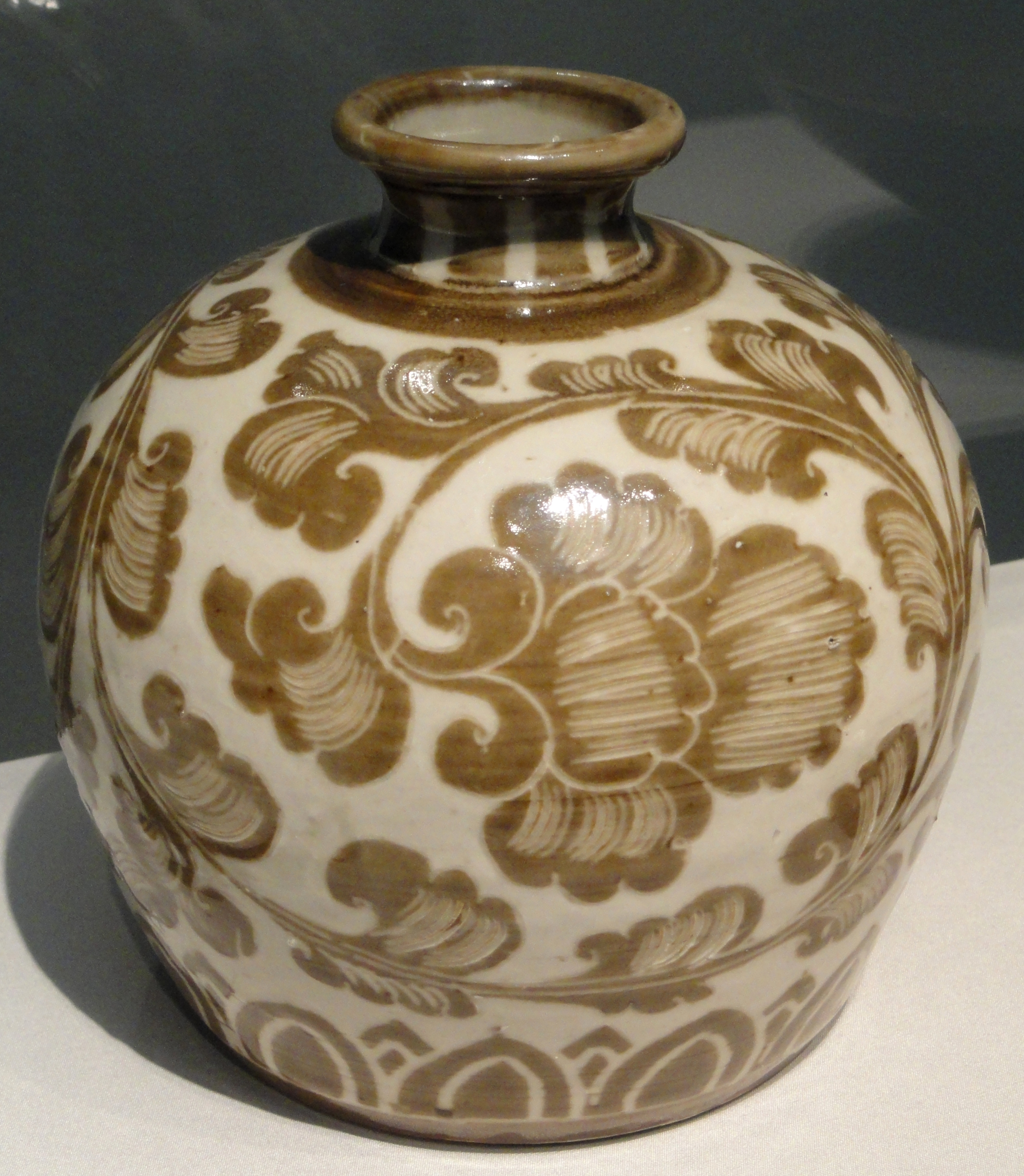
Song dynasty Ding porcelain bottle with iron pigment under a transparent ivory-toned glaze, c. 1100. Both the closed shape and the painted underglaze decoration are uncommon in Ding.

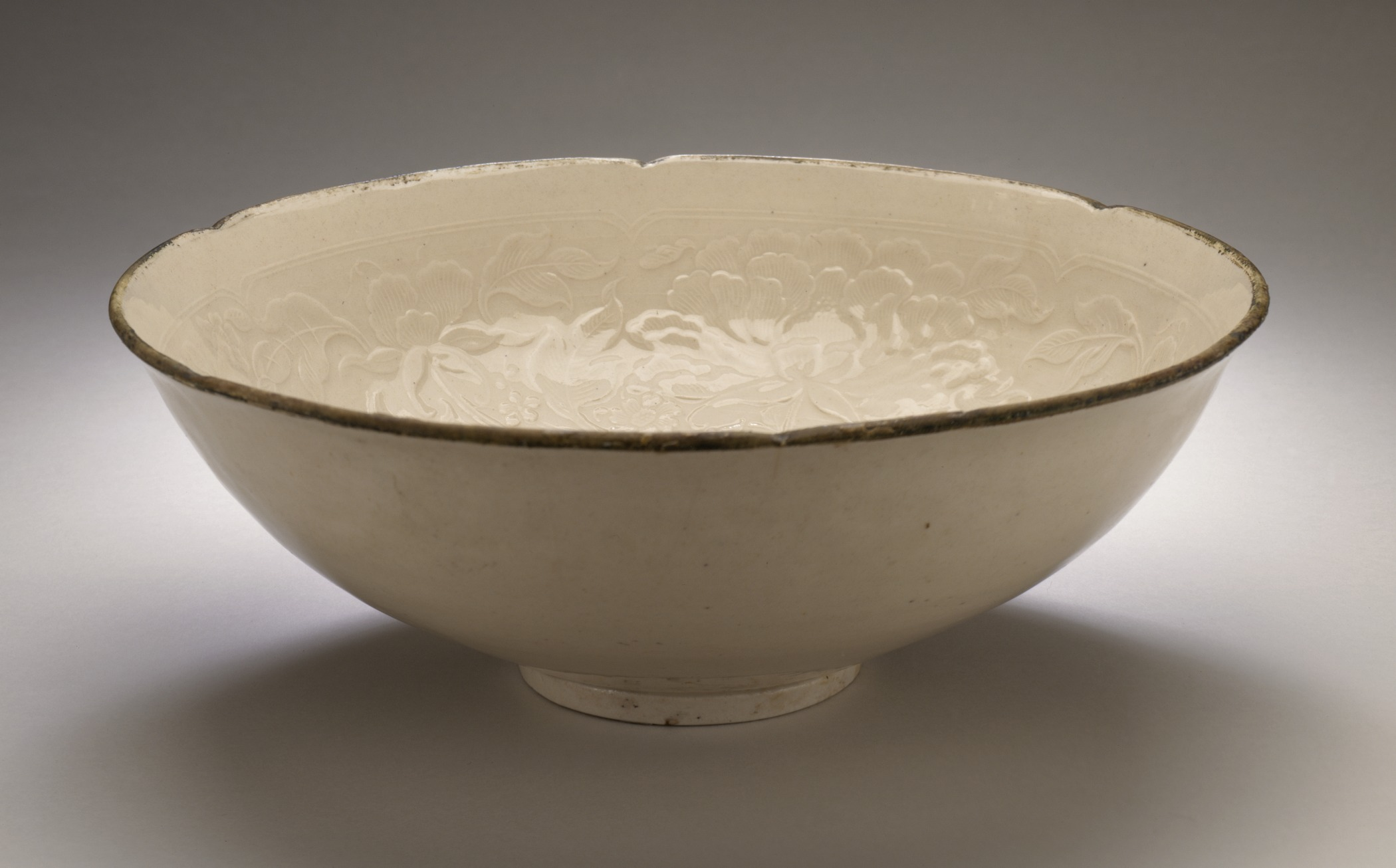
Bowl (wan) with peony, chrysanthemum, and prunus sprays, described by LACMA as "wheel-thrown stoneware with impressed decoration, transparent glaze, and banded metal rim", though others would call it porcelain. 12th century

Ding ware appeared to have begun by imitating Xing ware during the Tang dynasty, but by the Song dynasty, Ding kilns had replaced Xing as the pre-eminent producers of ceramics of northern China. The white glaze of Ding ware was noted for a slight cream or ivory tint, apart from which it was transparent. Earlier, pre-Song, pieces had a blueish tint as (like Xing ware) they were fired with wood, producing a reducing atmosphere. A change to firing with coal, probably in the 10th century, produced the tint described as "ivory".

Other "secondary" wares had monochrome glazes in different colours: a very rare black, various shades of red and brown, gold and green. These "are better known through literature than through surviving examples ... only the red and black are represented by entire pieces". These may lack any other decoration. Song court taste valued plain wares decorated only by exquisite monochrome glazes in colours that were very difficult to achieve, such as the famous Ru ware, produced for only 40 years, and with surviving pieces totalling a two-figure number. Another rare group is white with painted underglaze decoration in a brown derived from iron oxides.

Pieces produced in Ding ware were mostly open vessels of a relatively small size, with shapes and decoration often borrowed from metalwork, as in the bowls with lobed rims. Vases are relatively uncommon. Initially pieces were mostly thrown on the potter's wheel, often with templates, but in the late 11th century moulds began to be used, which included the inside decoration, previously carved or incised with a knife on the leather-hard piece. Any decoration on the outside of pieces continued to be hand-carved for some time.

While the decoration was hand-carved, it was mostly scrolling plant-forms including lotus and peony, with some simple animals such as ducks and fish. These were "generally rather open and well spaced, executed with remarkable fluency and an apparently unfailing sense of compositional balance". Moulds allowed more complexity, including scenes with children, landscapes and other animals.

The firing process was with bowls placed upside down in the kiln, which meant that the glaze had to be wiped from the rim, which left a rough rim, and many pieces were given a thin metal rim in silver or a "brassy alloy". The Ding kilns developed stepped saggars, allowing several bowls, slightly reducing in size, to be fired in the same saggar, increasing the efficiency of kiln loading.

Traditional East Asian thinking only classifies pottery into earthenware and porcelain, without the intermediate European class of stoneware, and the many local types of stoneware such as Ding ware were mostly classed as porcelain, though often not white and translucent. Terms such as "porcellaneous" or "near-porcelain" may be used in such cases.

== Fame and influence ==
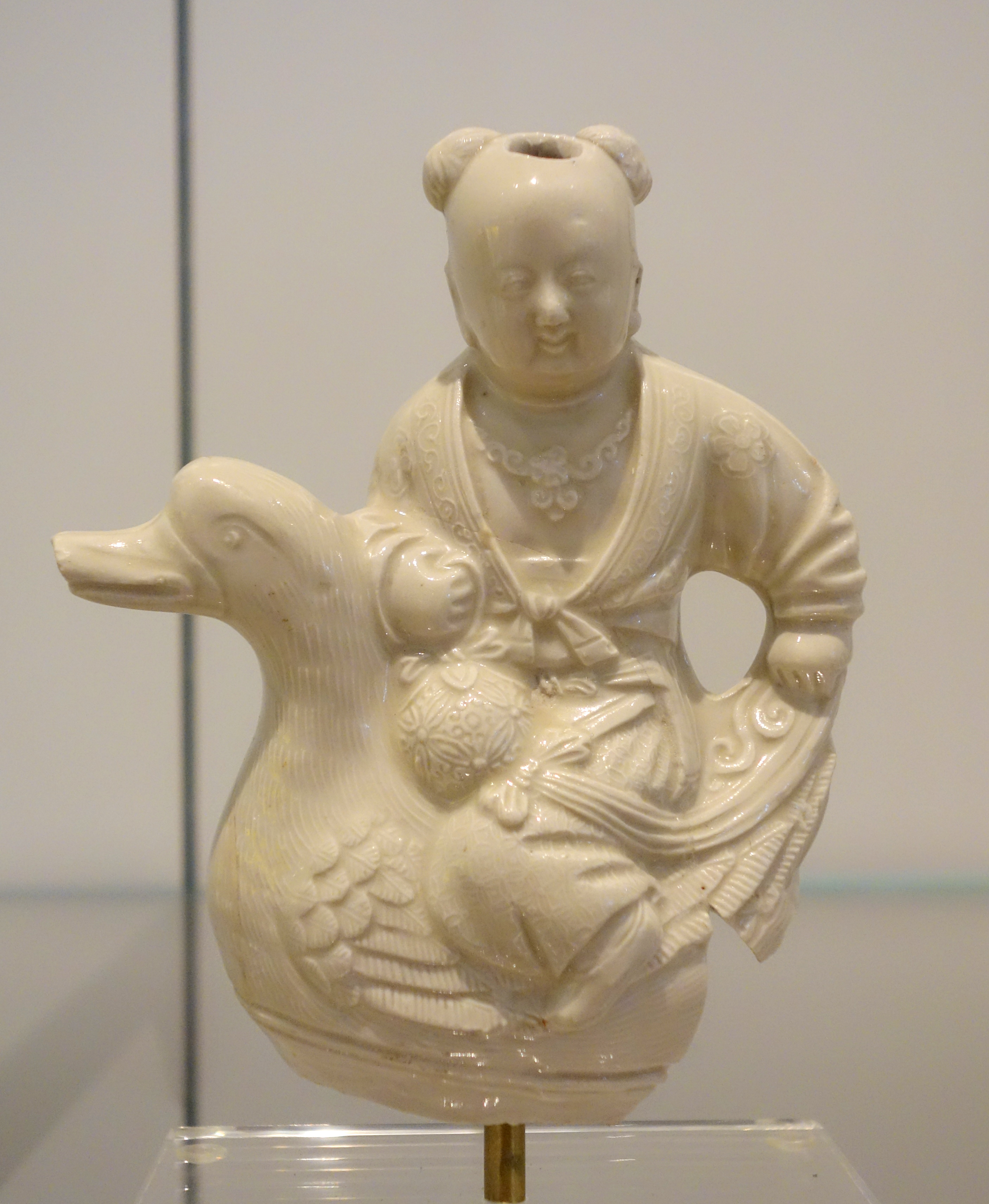
Ding ware ewer, "porcellanous ware", Jurchen Jin dynasty

The range and output of the wares was large, producing ceramics of high quality for the wealthy merchant class and the scholar-literati class, as well as tributary ceramics of the highest quality for the imperial court. A chronicle records that "the king went to pay his respects at the Zongde Dian and offered up 2,000 pieces of Ding ware decorated with gold", but other records suggest that the rough rims and "teardrops" formed by running glaze meant that they were not considered fine enough for use by the emperor himself, or at least had become so regarded by the late Southern Song.

Ding ware was later grouped as one of the Five Famous Kilns. It heavily influenced the early white wares of Jingdezhen, where the white porcelain preceding Qingbai ware is known as "Southern Ding", and Qingbai also shows considerable influence in its decoration.

Ding production continued under the Jin dynasty (1115–1234), non-Chinese interlopers from Manchuria. Jin court taste was very different from the Song, favouring elegant plant-scroll designs, now mostly moulded, which were more intricate than those already produced under the Northern Song. There was renewed borrowing from T'ang decoration in silver, lacquer and stone, and from metalware shapes, such as lobed or notched rims to bowls and plates. The increased complexity in scrolling plant designs was significant for the history of Chinese pottery; these monochrome designs in very shallow relief formed the basis of the iconic vocabulary of later blue and white pottery, pioneered at Jingdezhen, and of immense influence globally.

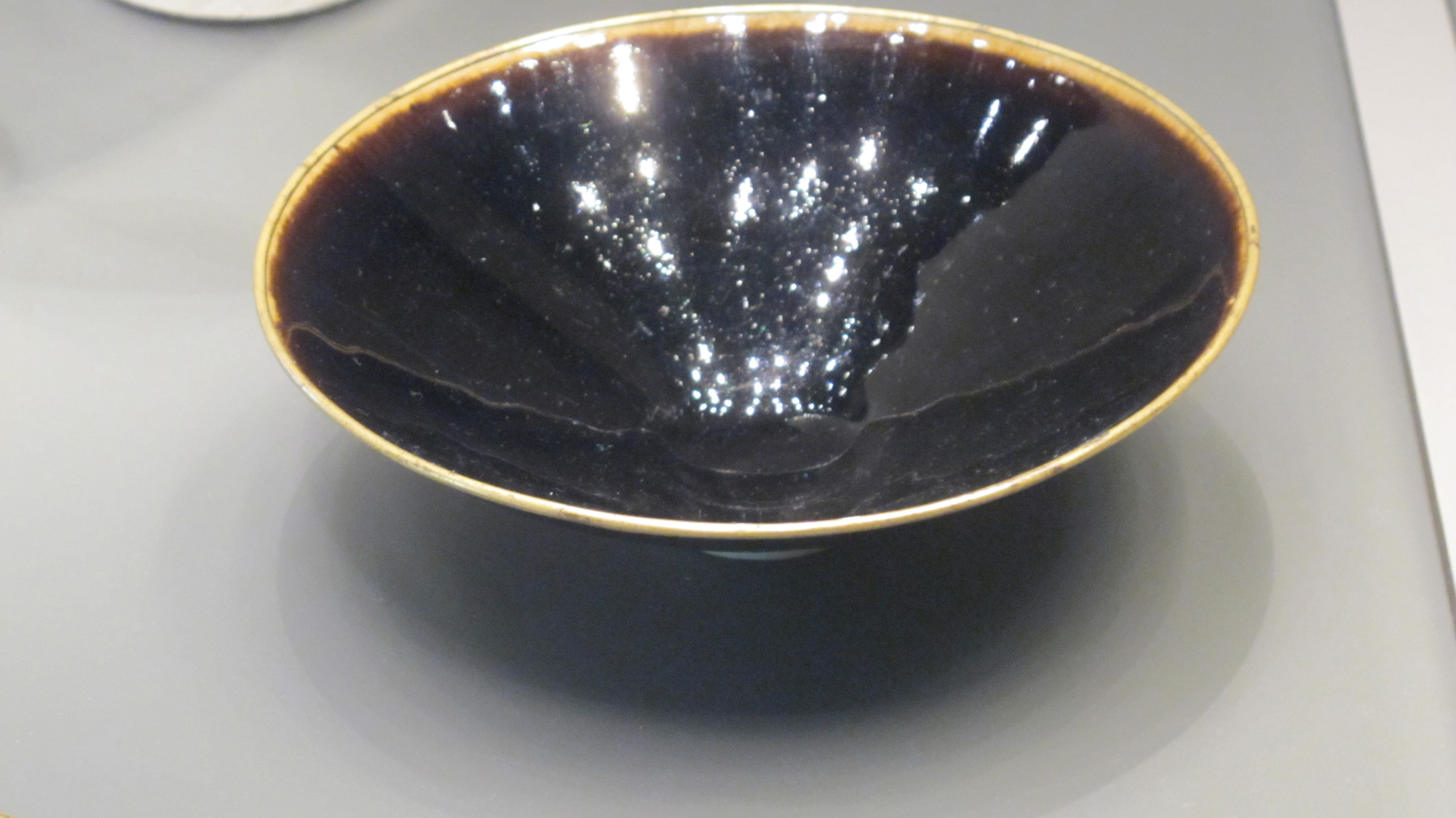
Rare black-glazed bowl, Northern Song, with copper rim

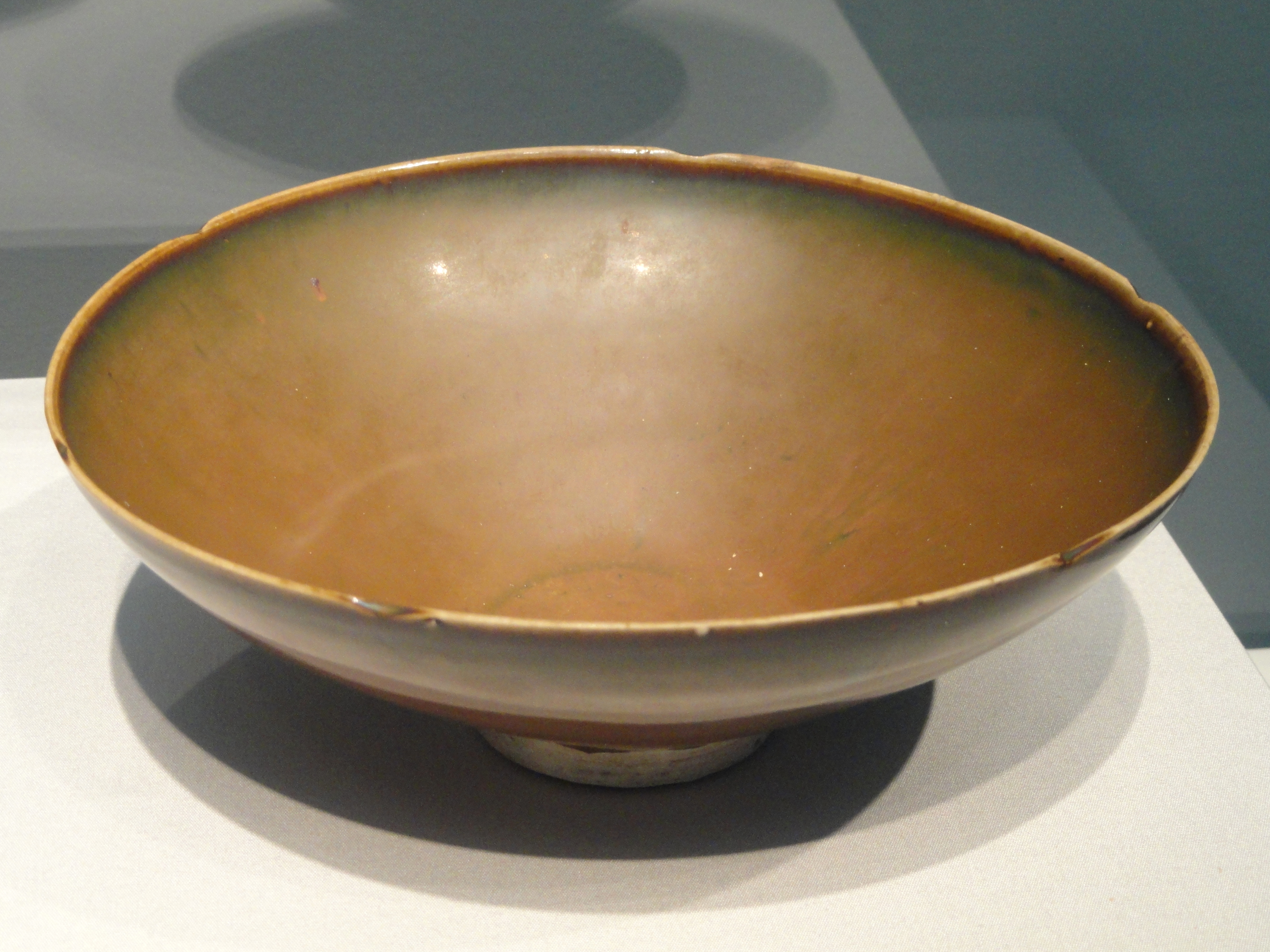
Rare brown-glazed bowl, Northern Song, with notched rim

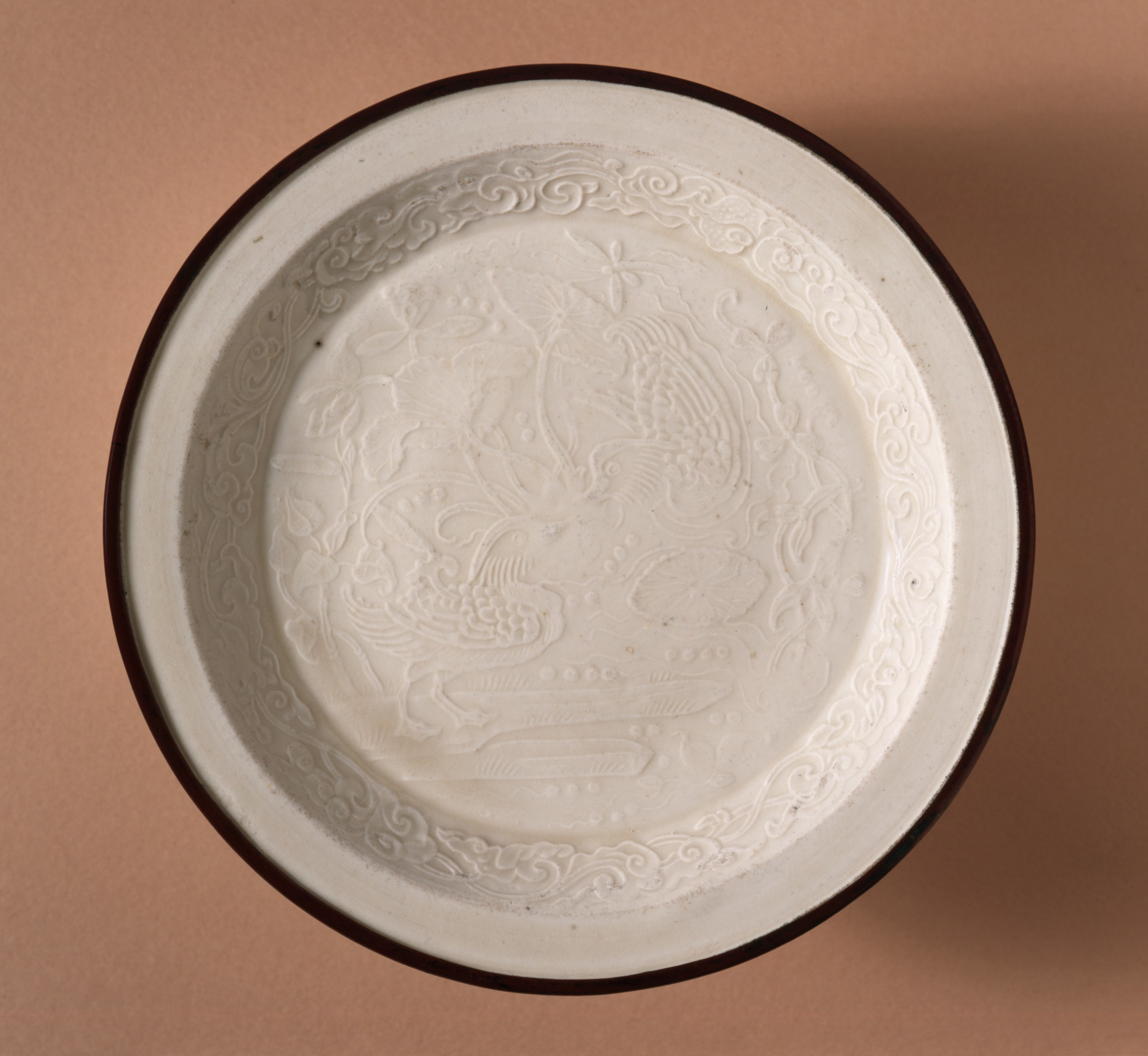
Dish with a Pair of Mandarin Ducks, moulded with impressed decoration and metal rim, diameter 5.5 in. (13.97 cm)

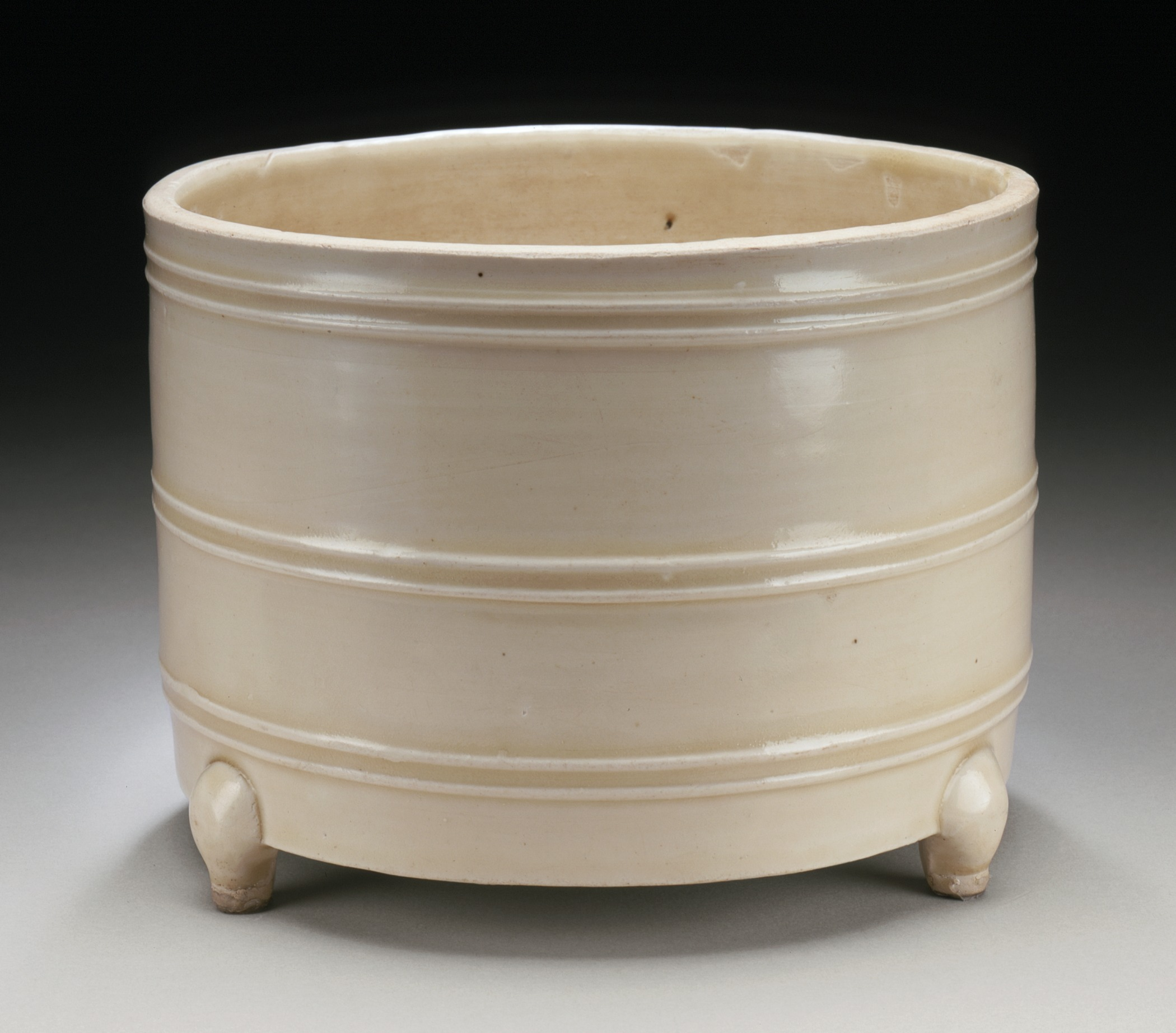
Incense Burner (Lu) in the form of an ancient Ritual bronze container (Lian), height 4.5 in. (11.43 cm)
