= Lincheng County =

Lincheng County 临城县
- County
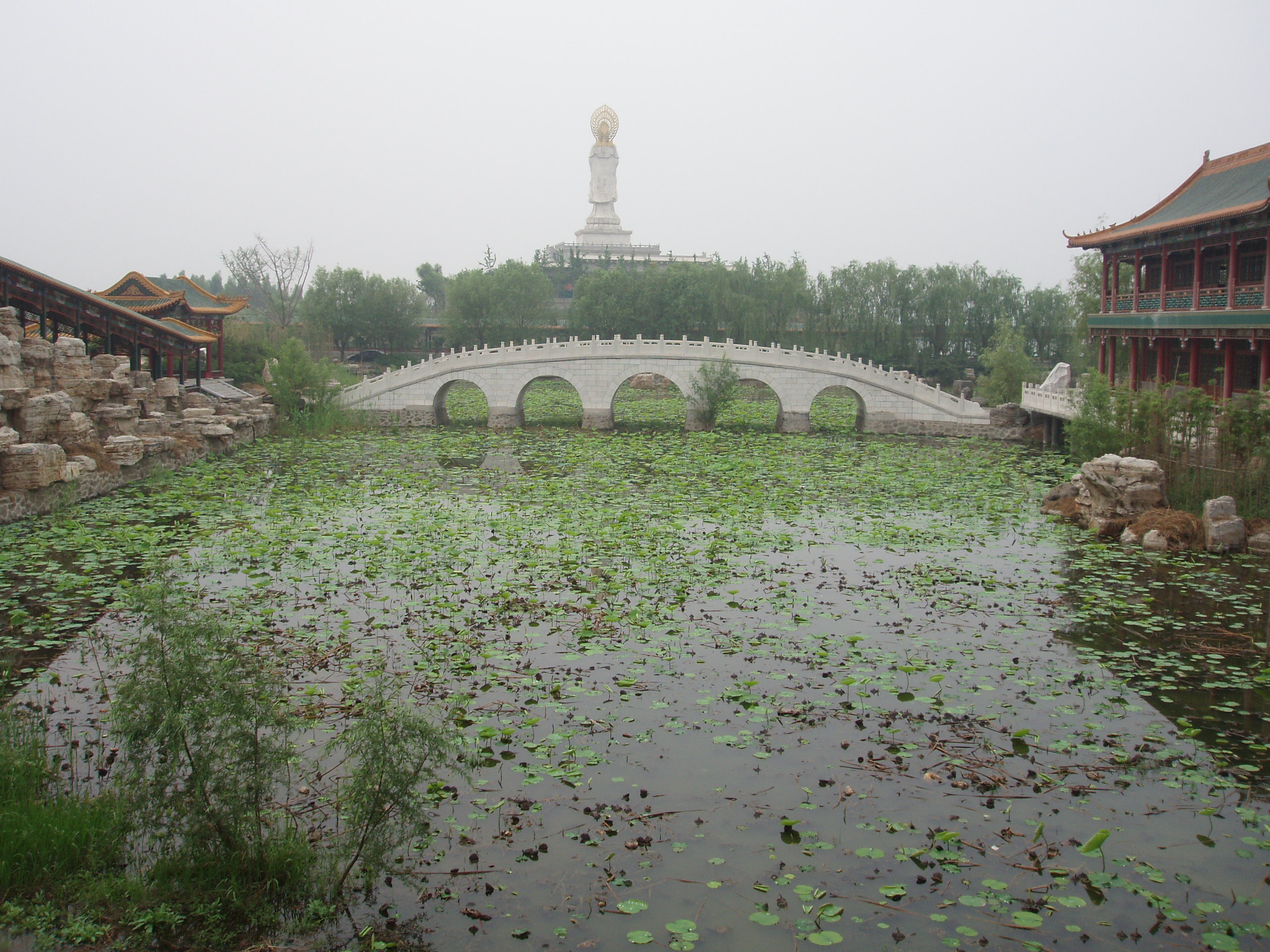
- Qishan Lake (歧山湖)

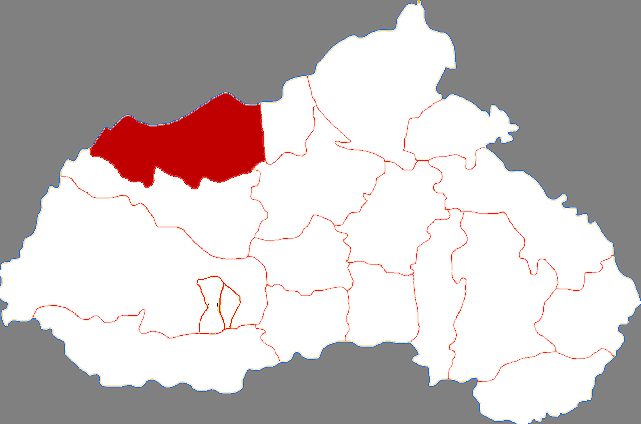
- Lincheng in Xingtai

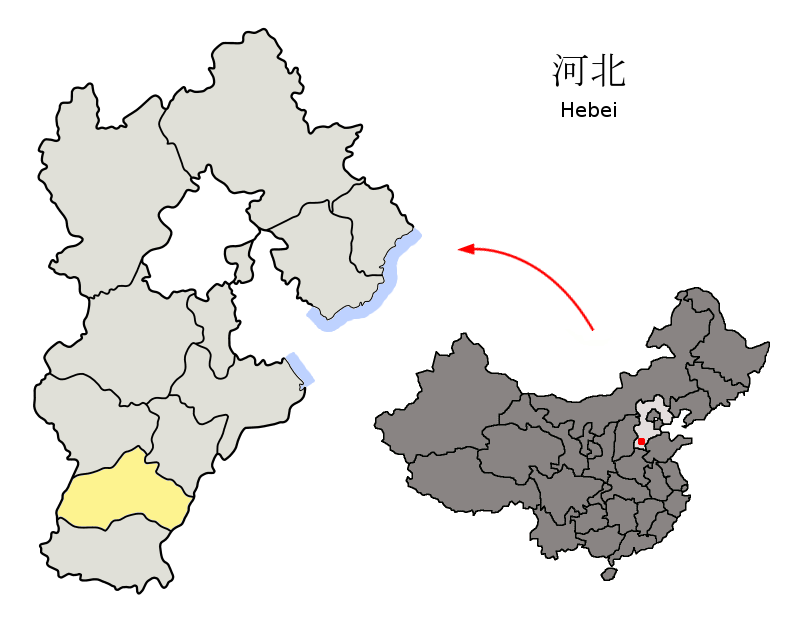
- Xingtai in Hebei
- Coordinates: 37°26′38″N 114°29′56″E
- Country: People's Republic of China
- Province: Hebei
- Prefecture-level city: Xingtai
- County seat: Lincheng Town (临城镇)

Area
  - Total: 797 km^{2} (308 sq mi)
- Elevation: 100 m (330 ft)

Population
  - Total: 204,000
  - Density: 256/km^{2} (663/sq mi)
- Time zone: UTC+8 (China Standard)
- Postal code: 054300
- Website: lch.gov.cn

Lincheng County (simplified Chinese: 临城县; traditional Chinese: 臨城縣; pinyin: Línchéng Xiàn) is a county in the southwest of Hebei province, People's Republic of China, in the foothills of the Taihang Mountains. It is under the administration of the prefecture-level city of Xingtai. In 2010, its population was 204,000 and lived in an area of 797 km^{2} (308 sq mi). It borders Neiqiu in the south, Longyao and Baixiang in the east, Gaoyi and Zanhuang in the north, and the province of Shanxi in the west.

== Administrative divisions ==
The county administers 4 towns and 4 townships.

Towns:

- Lincheng (临城镇), Dongzhen (东镇镇), Xishu (西竖镇), Haozhuang (郝庄镇)

Townships:

- Heicheng Township (黑城乡), Yageying Township (鸭鸽营乡), Shicheng Township (石城乡), Zhaozhuang Township (赵庄乡)

== Climate ==
Climate data for Lincheng, elevation 113 m (371 ft), (1991–2020 normals, extremes 1981–2010)
Month	Jan	Feb	Mar	Apr	May	Jun	Jul	Aug	Sep	Oct	Nov	Dec	Year
Record high °C (°F)	18.0 (64.4)	25.8 (78.4)	32.8 (91.0)	37.5 (99.5)	41.7 (107.1)	41.8 (107.2)	41.9 (107.4)	38.3 (100.9)	38.0 (100.4)	36.0 (96.8)	27.2 (81.0)	25.6 (78.1)	41.9 (107.4)
Mean daily maximum °C (°F)	3.4 (38.1)	7.6 (45.7)	14.7 (58.5)	21.7 (71.1)	27.4 (81.3)	32.2 (90.0)	32.2 (90.0)	30.2 (86.4)	26.6 (79.9)	20.6 (69.1)	11.7 (53.1)	5.0 (41.0)	19.4 (67.0)
Daily mean °C (°F)	−2.4 (27.7)	1.5 (34.7)	8.3 (46.9)	15.4 (59.7)	21.4 (70.5)	26.1 (79.0)	27.2 (81.0)	25.4 (77.7)	20.8 (69.4)	14.4 (57.9)	6.0 (42.8)	−0.6 (30.9)	13.6 (56.5)
Mean daily minimum °C (°F)	−6.9 (19.6)	−3.4 (25.9)	2.6 (36.7)	9.3 (48.7)	15.1 (59.2)	20.2 (68.4)	22.7 (72.9)	21.3 (70.3)	16.1 (61.0)	9.4 (48.9)	1.5 (34.7)	−4.7 (23.5)	8.6 (47.5)
Record low °C (°F)	−18.1 (−0.6)	−18.6 (−1.5)	−9.4 (15.1)	−2.5 (27.5)	5.0 (41.0)	10.6 (51.1)	16.3 (61.3)	12.1 (53.8)	5.5 (41.9)	−3.1 (26.4)	−13.3 (8.1)	−15.9 (3.4)	−18.6 (−1.5)
Average precipitation mm (inches)	2.6 (0.10)	4.8 (0.19)	9.3 (0.37)	26.6 (1.05)	41.5 (1.63)	52.6 (2.07)	146.2 (5.76)	140.8 (5.54)	60.3 (2.37)	25.8 (1.02)	15.5 (0.61)	3.0 (0.12)	529 (20.83)
Average precipitation days (≥ 0.1 mm)	1.8	2.6	2.8	5.8	7.1	8.7	11.8	11.0	7.7	5.7	3.7	2.0	70.7
Average snowy days	2.6	2.7	1.2	0.2	0	0	0	0	0	0	1.4	2.5	10.6
Average relative humidity (%)	58	53	50	54	57	58	74	79	73	66	65	62	62
Mean monthly sunshine hours	150.3	162.6	208.0	234.0	257.1	224.3	184.8	194.0	192.6	183.0	158.8	153.7	2,303.2
Percentage possible sunshine	49	53	56	59	58	51	42	47	52	53	53	52	52
Source: China Meteorological Administration
