= Heicheng Township =

Heicheng Township 黑城乡
- Township
- Location in Hebei
- Coordinates: 37.5176°N 114.4865°E
- Country: People's Republic of China
- Province: Hebei
- Prefecture-level city: Xingtai
- County-level city: Lincheng County

Area
  - Land: 17,000,000 km^{2} (6,600,000 sq mi)
- Time zone: UTC+8 (China Standard)

Heicheng Township (simplified Chinese: 黑城乡; traditional Chinese: 黑城鄉; pinyin: Hēichéng Xiāng) is a township under the administration of Lincheng County, Hebei, China. As of 2020, it has 218 villages under its administration.
