= Traditional patterns of Korea =

Patterns used in Korean art

Traditional Korean patterns are often featured throughout Korea on architecture, clothes, porcelain, necessities, and more. These patterns can be recognized either by one of the four time periods they originated from (The Three Kingdoms, Unified Silla, Goryeo, Joseon), or by their shape (character, nature, lettering, and/or geometry).

== Korean traditional patterns ==
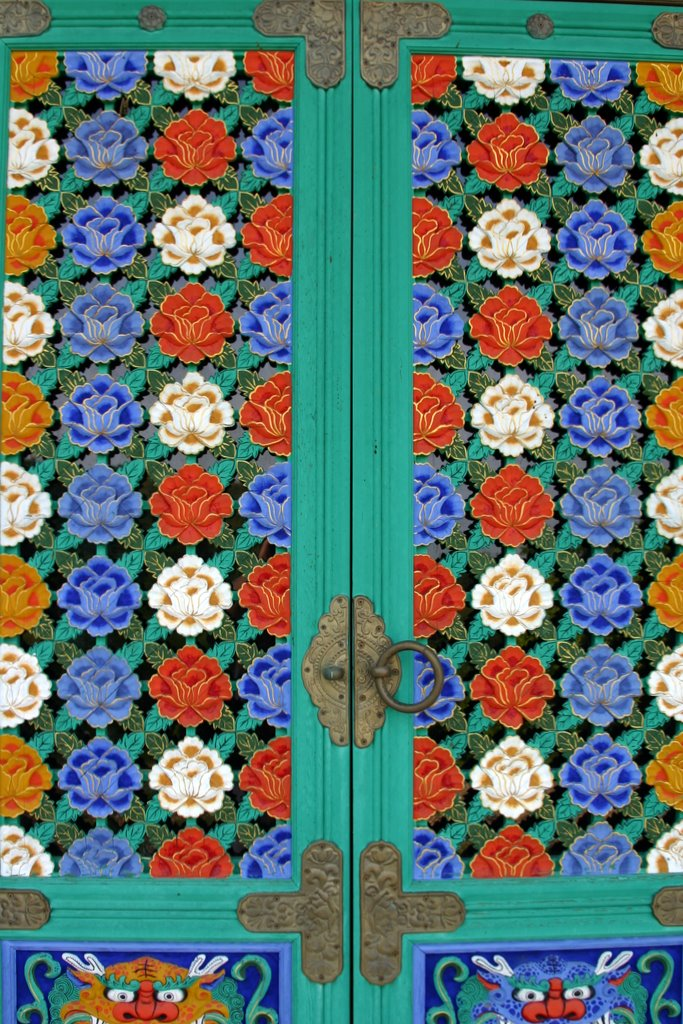
A scenery of Andong City, Gyeongsangbuk-do, South Korea. wangheungsa- Buddhist temple

The longing for a realistic desire or association with the world through a specific object is the principle of charm for Korean patterns. Traditional patterns can be seen as incantation prints depending on whether a wish is realistic for an ideal life. As a result, traditional Korean patterns are seen as visual art detailed with symbolism, value, and emotion. These prints often capture the beauty of nature, longing for a utopia, affection, and the prayers for good fortune. One of the major patterns used in Korea is a peony in bloom, symbolizing wealth. Additionally, pomegranates or grapes are placed in a woman's living space to encourage fertility.

Patterns may also represent a sign, despite whether or not the pattern features fictional subjects. This is mostly shown with a dragon or phoenix patterns, which is often regarded as a lucky sign depending on the story behind it. Peach patterns invoke meditation and longevity, representing a mythical peach that was said to grow in heaven (Xi Wangmu legend, 서왕모 전설). A carp pattern symbolizes success in life, as presented in a myth. These representations are derived from the artists who created the patterns, or the people who witnessed and experienced such things. Since the Three Kingdoms period, traditional Korean patterns were generally involved with Buddhism, in addition to Confucianism and Taoism.

== History ==
=== The Three Kingdoms period ===
It was in the Three Kingdoms period that patterns showed distinctive Korean styles. The patterns of this period were influenced by Chinese culture and Buddhist art. Because the three kingdoms were in the same cultural zone, the artifacts of the three kingdoms are similar, while at the same time showing respective differences. For example, four symbols (사신도) were the main theme in Goguryeo murals. The symbols are also observed in Silla earthenware. The 'Cheonma (天馬, literally translated to the horse of the sky)' drawings in Silla 'Cheonmachong' royal tomb (천마총) were quite similar to Goguryeo's mural paintings in a tumulus.

=== Unified Silla period ===
In the mid-7th century, Silla unified the three kingdoms and created a new national culture. During this period, Buddhism art especially flourished. As trade with the countries bordering Western China, Unified Silla introduced new crafting technologies and styles. One of the examples of these new patterns was the floral medallion motif pattern (寶相華紋,보상화문). The floral medallion motif pattern was introduced from Persia to Korea and Japan in the 7th century. The fictional flower has eight leaves with sharpened ends. Interests regarding the matter of the afterlife also increased during the period, and were reflected through geometric patterns such as comb-pattern, triangle, circle, and the floral medallion motif.

=== Goryeo period ===
Since Goryeo endorsed Buddhism as the state religion, and continued the legacy of the society of the prosperous Unified Silla aristocracy based on rich Buddhist traditions, Buddhist art flourished. Goryeo patterns tended to be more colorful. Goryeo celadon was painted with patterns such as clouds, lotuses, and cranes. Goyeo lacquerware, inlaid with mother-of-pearl, displayed patterns like chrysanthemum, waterfowl.

Crane pattern in Goryeo celadon

=== Joseon dynasty period ===
Joseon art was not a product of previous traditionally trained skills, but rather was an independent development from previous traditions. Characteristic of the period was the 'gil sang' pattern, which are translated as lucky signs (길상무늬, 吉祥). Examples of gil sang patterns include Lotus pattern, 'man' (卍) pattern, the ten traditional Symbols of Longevity (十長生), letter pattern and so on. Letter patterns are patterns using Chinese characters (i.e. 부(富)·귀(貴)·수(壽)·복(福)·강(康)·영(寧)·희(囍)) which have the meanings of wealth, honor, long life, happiness and peace respectively and were used with decorative frames.

This White celadon of the Joseon dynasty is painted 'gil sang' letter pattern at the center.

== Usage ==
Korean traditional patterns were used in architecture, daily goods, and artifacts of Buddhist temples to further emphasize Buddhism. The main purpose for making patterns was decorative, and often functioned to protect the object. For example, 'Dancheong' is a Korean artifact painted with various patterns on a wooden structure. The reason for making the Dancheong pattern was to protect the structure from decay from rain or wind. Dancheong was especially useful at showing colours important to Korea, these were blue, red, black, yellow, white, black.

At court, the order of precedency and position were exhibited through a court suit's embroidered pattern. The king's suit named 'Gonryongpo (곤룡포)' was embroidered with a gold dragon. A civil official's suit was embroidered with a crane and a military official's suit was embroidered with a tiger. The number of animals displayed rank. In daily life, patterns used packages, cloth scraps and embroidered pads attached to both sides of a pillow for decoration and a wooden rice-cake pattern maker. Generally, each family had a distinct rice-cake pattern; this pattern was not changed and was not used by another family.

== Classification ==
Patterns can be classified by subject matter or meaning. For example, a typical subject matter can be animals like the dragon or the phoenix and plants, such as lotus or bamboo. Or, there are letter patterns like '卍' and geometrical patterns. According to meaning, there are the ten symbols of longevity (십장생) and complex patterns that represent longing for bearing many sons or longing for success.

=== Character patterns ===
Character pattern refers to faces or shapes of humans, mountain gods, Buddha, the Four Devas. Many of those patterns are influenced by Korean past history and culture like Buddhism.

One major example of Korean character patterns is the Dokkaebi pattern, which is typically used as a background pattern for older documents, a knife ornamented with silver, and root tile, originating since Silla era.

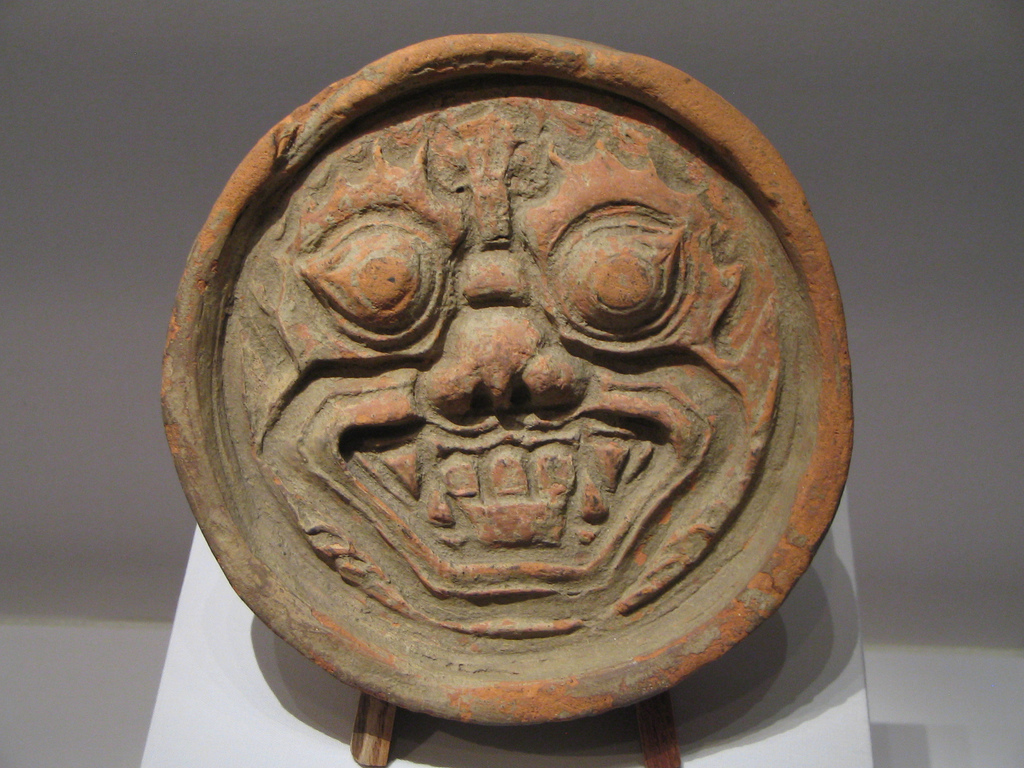
Dokkaebi pattern was shown Roof-end tile from Goguryeo dated to the fifth or sixth century.

=== Animal patterns ===
Animals who give goodness or fear to humans often used as subject. When animals are represented as pattern, they were not only existing, but also symbolic of a human's spirit. Figures represent the human face or form, or refer to such pattern expressed fresh, Buddha, deities, imp. In Korea, such as the Buddha and the deities, bicheonsang has appeared frequently in Buddhist art. Animal The existence of which was to benefit the animals fear humans were also frequently used as a material of pattern. When expressed as animal patterns, rather than simply taking only their form. Symbolism has also produced in the human consciousness.

- Dragon

Dragon is a mysterious animal made real and imaginal animal's strength. The dragon became accepted as the head of all animals. Because dragon has infinite power, people thought of the dragon as a mysterious creature.

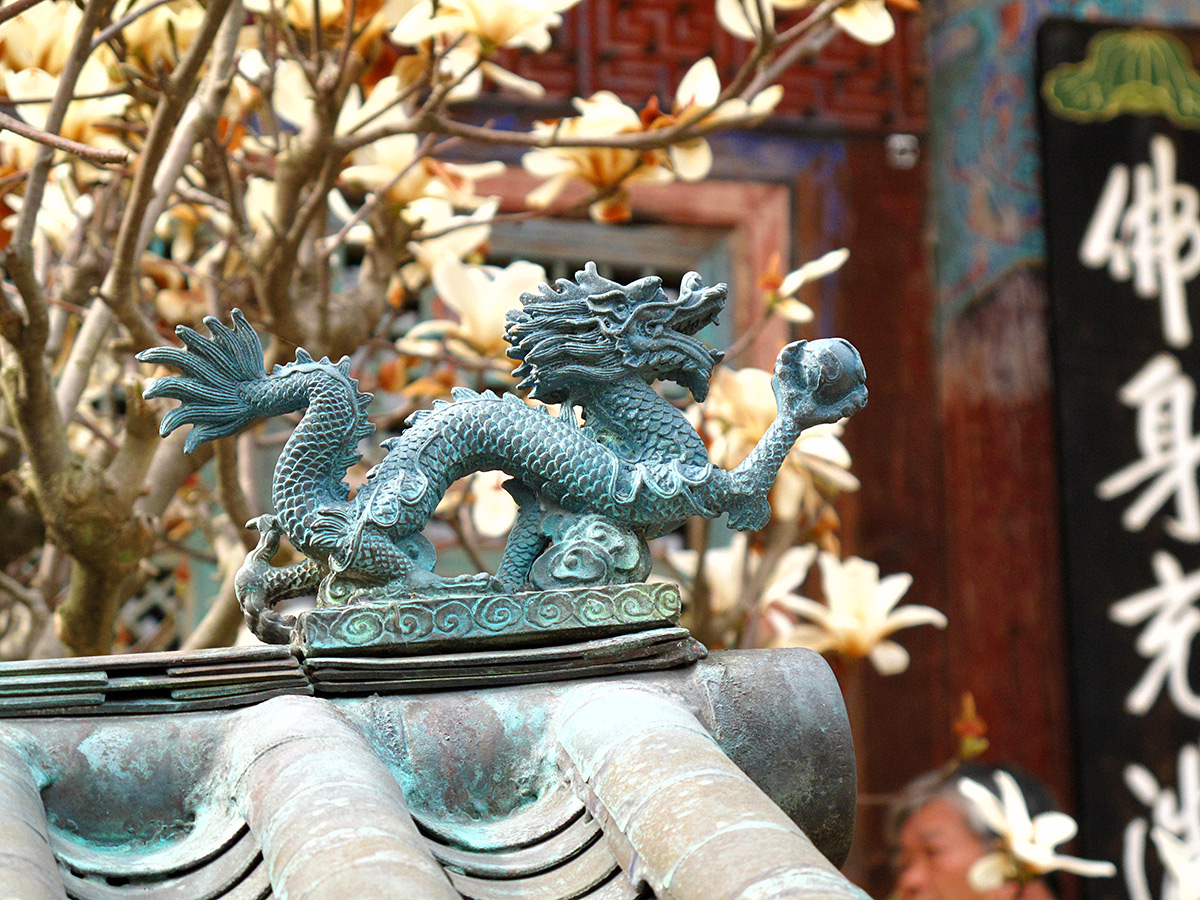
dragon pattern in Korea, 'Jangansa' Buddhist temple

- Phoenix

Iran represents the Phoenix, associated with the rod and the feminine principle, while the male principle is represented by sulfur. Love gives rise to the head of the department, which facilitates the development of all animals through a new form of imagination.

- Fish

The fish pattern means richness. That human use fish pattern guessed at the Stone Age. These customs come to fishing life. In Korea, fish patterns could be searched for stones near a residential area in New Stone Age.

- Tiger

Tiger is third of the 12 zodiac animals. It has trusted doughty, greedy, cruel. But it could prevent harmful diseases. In the Joseon dynasty period, there are customs to attach picture drawn tiger patterns in the gate to prevent evil.

=== Plant patterns ===
Plants were a good subject because they gave much favour to humans and have a beautiful shape. The main subject of plants is a flower. Without a specific symbol, the flower symbolizes beauty, and thus flower patterns often do not represent a specific flower, but rather a common flower shape.

- lotus

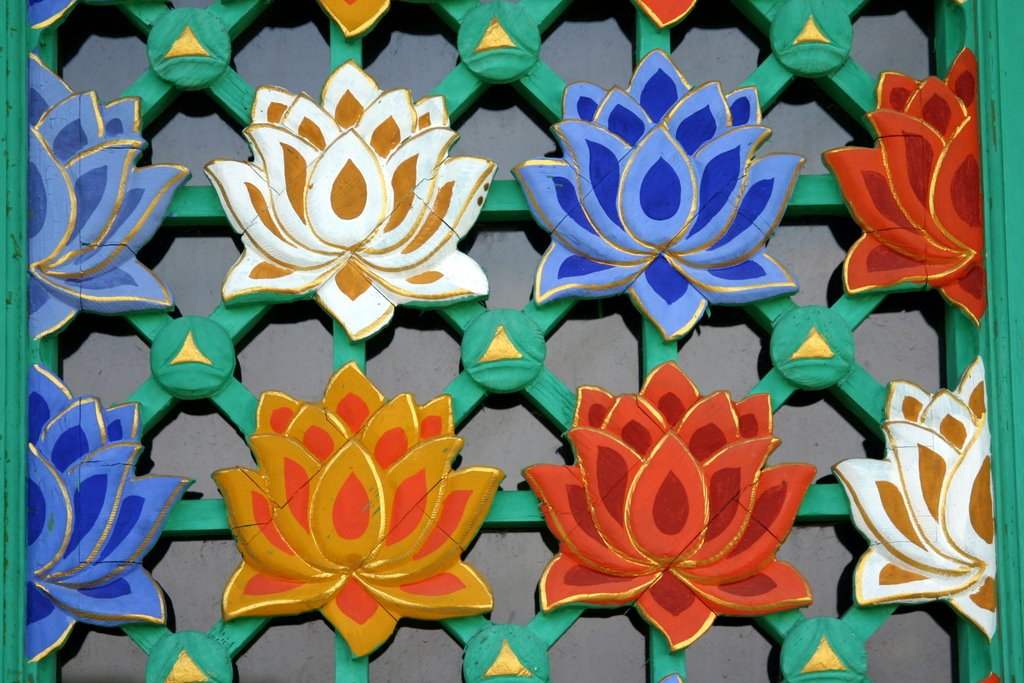
Lotus pattern decorated at window frames (dancheong) in Korea temple 'Gwangheungsa'

The lotus is the flower representing Buddhism. It was thought to be a pure symbol because it didn't colour dirty in dirty wetland, And lotus means a disinterested attitude, purification in Buddhism. Lotus carved in the female object is a symbol of creation and reproduction. Also, waterbird can be shown near lotus pattern. This means getting seed of life, in fact, means begetting a son.

- chrysanthemum

Chrysanthemum is the oldest flower in the orient. It means high integrity and elegance.

=== Seven Treasures ===
When using artificial patterns, the meaning of the symbol was considered more important than the design itself. The Seven Treasures (칠보문) are the most common artificial patterns used. The Seven Treasures signify objects which are considered auspicious. The Seven Treasures include: coin, horn of water buffalo, book, wormwood, ornament used for wrapping cloth (방승,方勝), mirror, and percussion instrument (특경,特磬).

- The Seven treasure

Coin means good fortune, a horn of water buffalo means great fortune, diamond for wrapping cloth is for good wishes. The illustrated book is for smooth office life. Wormwood is a kind of medicinal herb and used to light fires, and is attributed to longevity. Mirrors symbolize king or power. The percussion instrument 'teck kyeong' (a kind of idiophone) (특경,特磬) is a traditional Korean instrument made of jade.

The term Seven Treasures may also refer to the seven treasures mentioned in Buddhist texts. These treasures generally included at least some of the following: gold, silver, emerald, coral, agate, lapis lazuli, giant clamshell, glass and pearl.

=== Natural (Landscape) pattern ===
Nature patterns are patterns that use things found in nature, excluding animals and plants. Common themes are Sun, moon, and stars. Landscapes and strangely shaped rocks are also common. These patterns usually symbolize longevity, because of their immutability.

- Cloud pattern
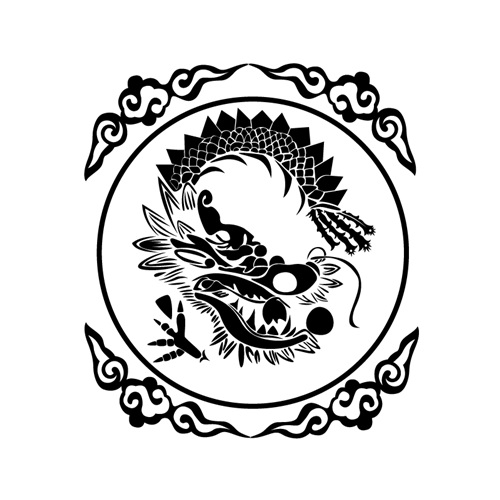
  This dragon pattern is used with cloud.

Cloud is the most common nature pattern. In the past, people believed if they pursued virtue while they lived, they could rise to the sky riding a cloud or attain Buddha-hood. Cloud patterns are also used to represent the dragon's divine spirit. Patterns with cranes are usually also seen with clouds in the background.

Cloud patterns are divided into three shapes. The first shape is a cloud being blown in the wind, the second shape is a cloud floating in the sky, and the third is scattered and dotted clouds. These shapes of cloud patterns were different by era. Each pattern reflected different social backgrounds.

=== Letter pattern ===
Letter patterns use certain letters as part of the design by continuously placing specific letters. Placing letters with auspicious meanings on an object was believed to bring good luck to the owner. Commonly used letters are: 'Bok (복,福), Hee (희,囍), or Su (수,壽)'.

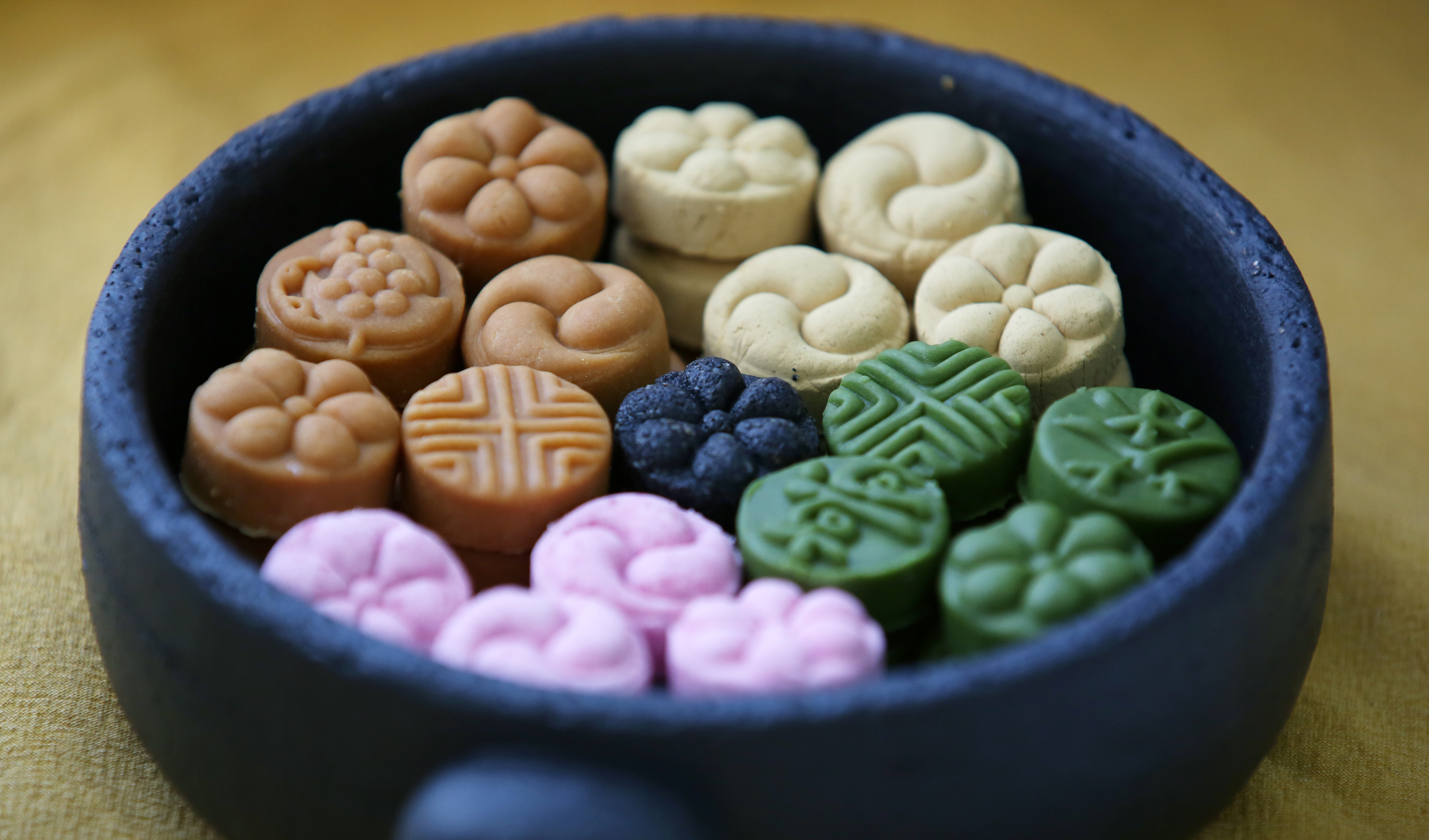
Letter pattern was carved in Korean patterned savoury cake 'dasik'.

=== Geometric pattern ===
Geometric patterns are patterns formed by horizontal, vertical, and diagonal lines, or circles. These patterns can be found as far back as prehistoric times, and are considered to be the most primitive patterns. Tools made in the Neolithic period and Bronze Age have repeated stripes, circles and concentric circles as designs. These patterns are thought to represent the sun, rays of sunlight, and rain. Other geometric patterns include:

- Taegeuk pattern and the Eight Trigrams for divination

Taegeuk means development, prosperity by balance of yin and yang (negative and positive).

'Taegeuk' represents ultimate truth that is origin of all creation in Eastern philosophy. It was mainly used in the Joseon dynasty period. The Eight Trigrams for divination is a kind of geometrical symbol representing the basic form of the phenomenal world. Straight line with no break (一) represents 'yang', and Line with a break in the centre (--) represents 'yin (negative)'. One yang sign and two yin sign can be united and two yang sign and one yin sign can be united and each is one of trigrams. The Eight Trigrams for divination is explained all nature phenomenon.

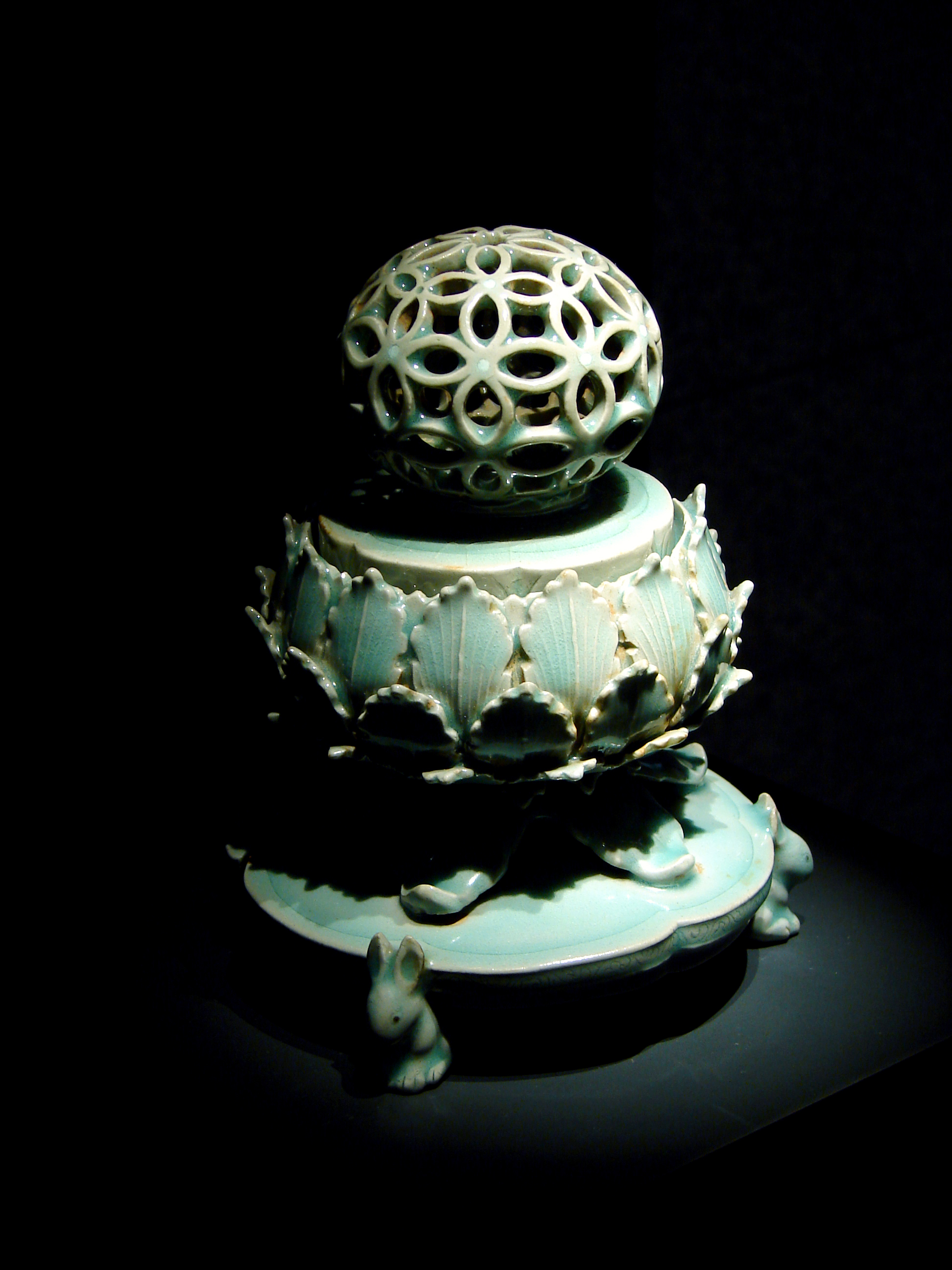
Interlocking circle pattern, Chilbo-mun (칠보문), or Shippo dates from 12th century

The use of interlocking circles, Chilbo-mun (칠보문), to form a geometric pattern dates in Korean history at least as far back as the Goryeo period. This same pattern can also be found in Japan where it is called Shippo-tsunagi aka seven treasures. Modern Korean potters, like Shin Sang-ho, have utilized this repeating pattern in double openwork

=== Complex pattern ===
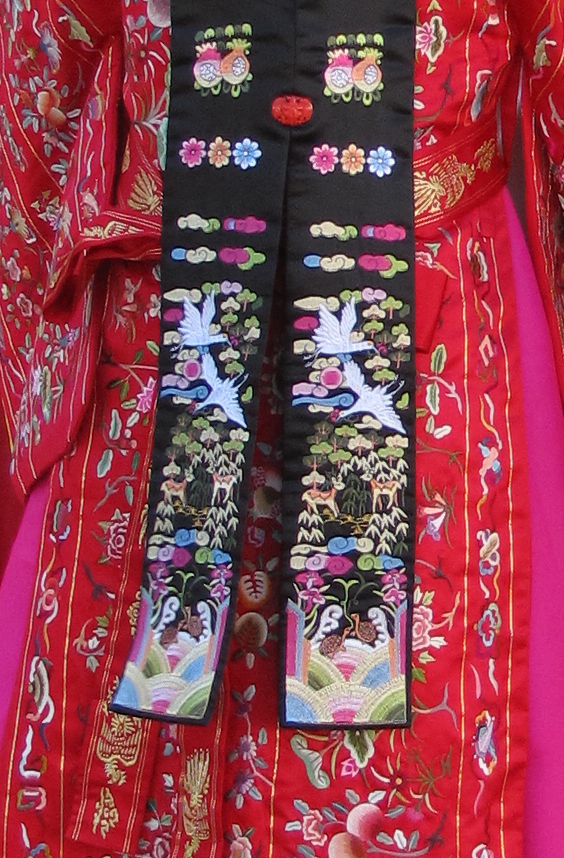
This pattern shown in the garment shows the ten traditional symbols of longevity(十長生). All 10 symbols are used in the pattern: sun, mountain, stone, cloud, fine tree, crane, elixir plant, turtle, dear-.

Complex patterns are patterns that show many compounded subjects. For instance, to emphasize the auspicious nature of the dragon, a symbol of defence against evil spirits, it can be depicted with clouds. Also, a common combination is putting apricot blossoms, which represents spring and longevity, together with palgajo (bird), which represents filial piety. Patterns can be arranged by putting ones with similar meanings together, or combining ones with different meanings to create a new symbol.

=== Shipjangsaengmun (十長生) ten symbols of longevity (십장생) ===
Shipjangsaengmun, also ship-jangsaengmum, is a common theme in Korean paintings, folding-screens, lacquerware, pottery, and more recently metal gates. All of these elements individually connote longevity throughout East Asia, but it was Korean artists who grouped them into ten, a number that means perfect and full in Asian culture. Typically, on large works, all ten symbols are incorporated into a scene integrating each element. The ten most commonly used symbols along with their Korean translations and brief meaning are:

- Sun (해 hae) – Energy of heaven that nourishes life
- Mountains (산 san) – Never changing
- Water (물 mul) – Flexibility
- Clouds (구름 guleum) – Heavenly water without a care
- Pine trees (소나무 so-namu) – Vitality, dignity, remains green in winter
- Mushroom of immortality (Ganoderma lucidum) - Oriental medicine with supposed health effects
- Tortoise or turtles (거북이 geobug-i) – Known for a long life
- Deer usually sika deer (사슴 saeseum) – Gentle, peaceful creature and medicine from horns
- Red-crowned crane (두루미 dulumi) – Communication with heaven, fidelity
- Stone (돌 dol) – Hard and enduring

Bamboo, which also can remain green in the winter and grows quickly, is sometimes used instead of pine trees. Other items which may be incorporated include: peaches – a fruit consumed by the King of Heaven and other immortals to keep them ageless; fish – leisure, success, harmony; fish along with reeds – longevity; and chrysanthemums – nobility rejuvenation.

To accomplish a complete ship-jangsaengmum on a single ceramic vase requires a particular large vase. Further, the larger the vase, the more likely it will not survive the firing process. Korean potter Kim Se-yong reportedly required a decade of failed attempts before finally successfully firing his celadon ship-jangsaengmum vase weighing 157 kg (350 lbs).

=== Four Gentlemen (Sagunja 사군자) ===
See full article for the Four Gentlemen also translated as the Four Gracious Plants. It is also a frequent theme in Korean patterns. Rather than integrating all four into a setting, each element is typicity depicted individually especially on the four individual sides of a box or vase.

== See also ==
- Korean culture
