= Moon jar =

Traditional Korean white porcelain jar

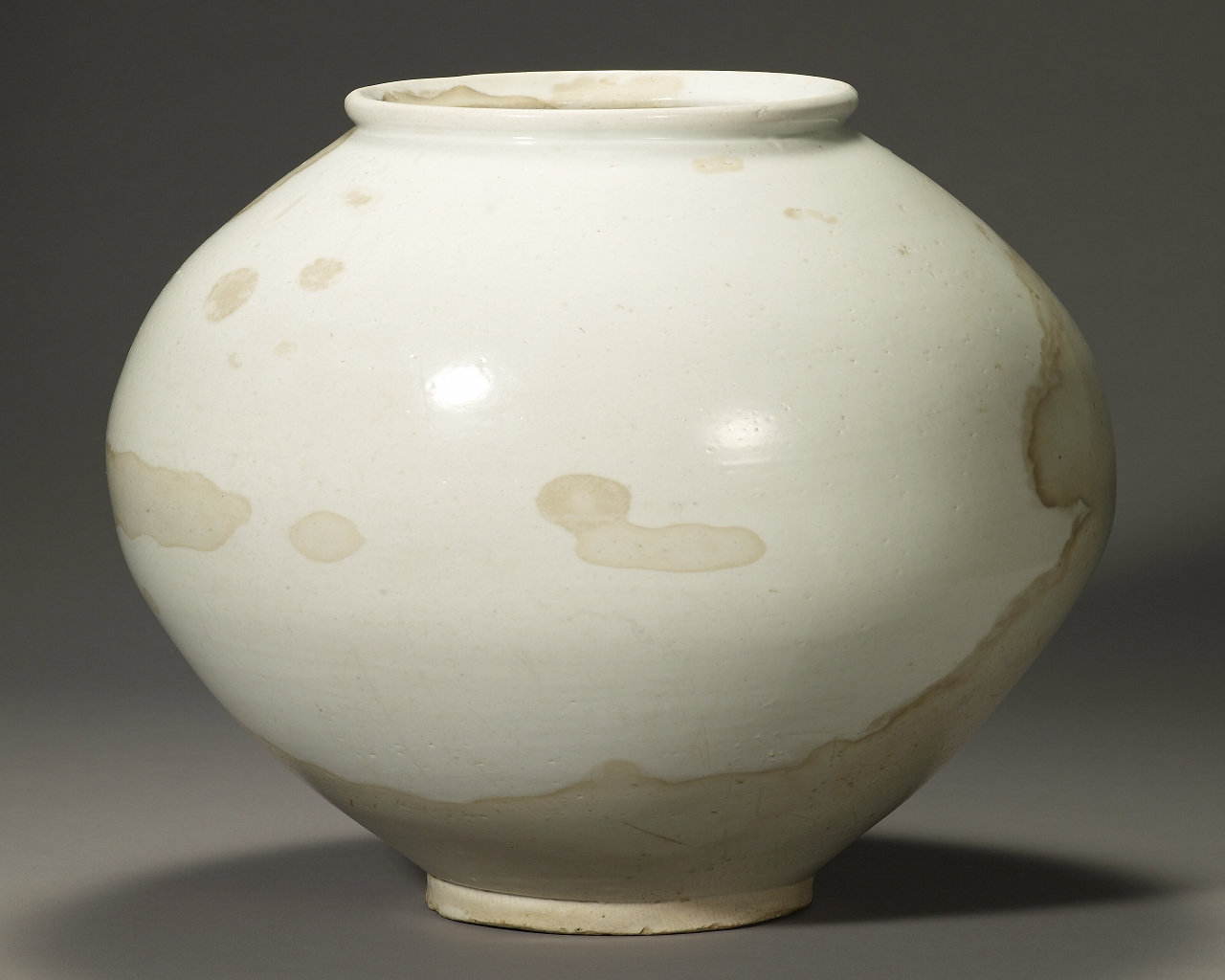
- Moon jar, Joseon white porcelain (National Treasure No. 309)

Korean name
- Hangul: 달항아리; 백자대호
- Hanja: 달缸아리; 白磁大壺
- Revised Romanization: dal hangari; baekja daeho
- McCune–Reischauer: tal hangari; paekcha taeho

Moon jar is a type of traditional Korean white porcelain which was made during the Joseon dynasty (1392–1910). The Joseon white porcelain was adopted as imperial ware in the fifteenth century. Moon jars first appeared in the late seventeenth century and remained popular until the mid-eighteenth century. However, they were not nicknamed “moon jars” until the 1950s. The name comes from its shape and milky color of the glaze to resemble the coloration of the moon. This type of vessel is unique to the Joseon Dynasty and were never produced in Japan.

There are approximately 20 surviving moon jars more than 40 cm (15.75 inches) tall, and of these 3 are Korea's national treasures. Several moon jars have sold at auction for in excess of $US1 million, with one selling for $US4.5 million in March 2023. At a March 2025 auction a moon jar fetched $US 2.8 million.

Moon jars often consists of two hemispherical halves that are thrown separately and then joined in the middle. The slightly uneven natural shape added to its appeal during the Joseon dynasty. Usually jars are made in a stable shape due to their wide bottom and smaller mouth, but moon jar has a wider mouth than the diameter of the bottom, causing instability, making it feel like the jar is floating in air.

It has inspired many artists such as Kim Whanki and Bernard Leach.

Moon jars have been described as being big, sturdy, rich, and proud with a slightly waddling and distorted appearance that is attractive. Because of this slight irregularity, most moon jars assume the shape of a waning moon, rather than a full moon. However, this grants them the “symmetry of asymmetry,” causing them to look different when viewed from various angles.

== Recent production and new styles ==
Since the 1950's, when production restarted in South Korea, about 150 Korean ceramists have made moon jars. Some critics contend the term moon jar can only be applied to plain white jars with no adornment that are made in a wood-fired kiln. However, the usage of the term is more fluid and a large variety of moon jars have been produced. These fall into the following categories:

=== Traditional moon jars ===
Traditional moon jars are fired within a wood-fired kiln that helps add character to an otherwise plain white vessel. Ceramist Kang Min-soo (b. 1971) calls this the ‘aesthetics of fire.’ Examples can be seen at:

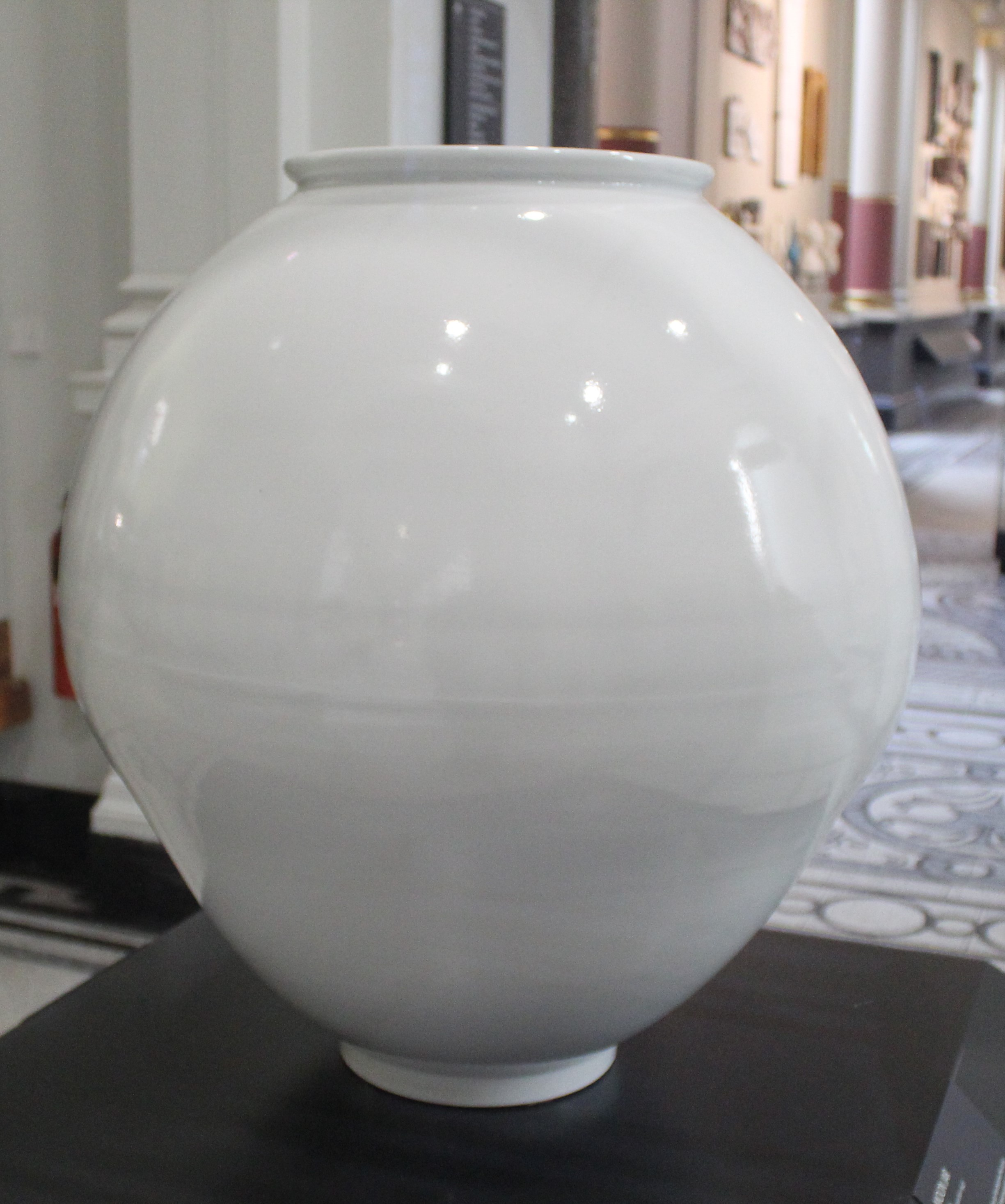
Modern moon jar by Park Young Sook

=== Modern moon jars ===
Modern ceramic production equipment, and clays that were not available during the Joseon period, have enabled ceramists to make pure white, symmetrical moon jars. Some of these are very large. Shin Sang-ho, the first ceramist to make this style within a gas-fired kiln, imported his kiln to South Korea after he worked in Japan. See photo for one example, additional examples at

=== Blue and white moon jars ===
This style features traditional, cobalt blue, Joseon-period motifs. Blue and white pottery was popular when moon jars were first made. Dragons, and the four gentlemen are common motifs. Ronald Reagan received a blue and white moon jar that was made by Shin and presented by Korean President Chun Doo-hwan. It was painted by a Korean artist named Chang Woosung (b. 1912 d. 2005). Examples can be seen at:

=== Buncheong moon jars ===
Buncheong ware was also popular during the Joseon period. This style combines the moon jar shape and this traditional design. Examples can be seen at

=== Celadon moon jars ===
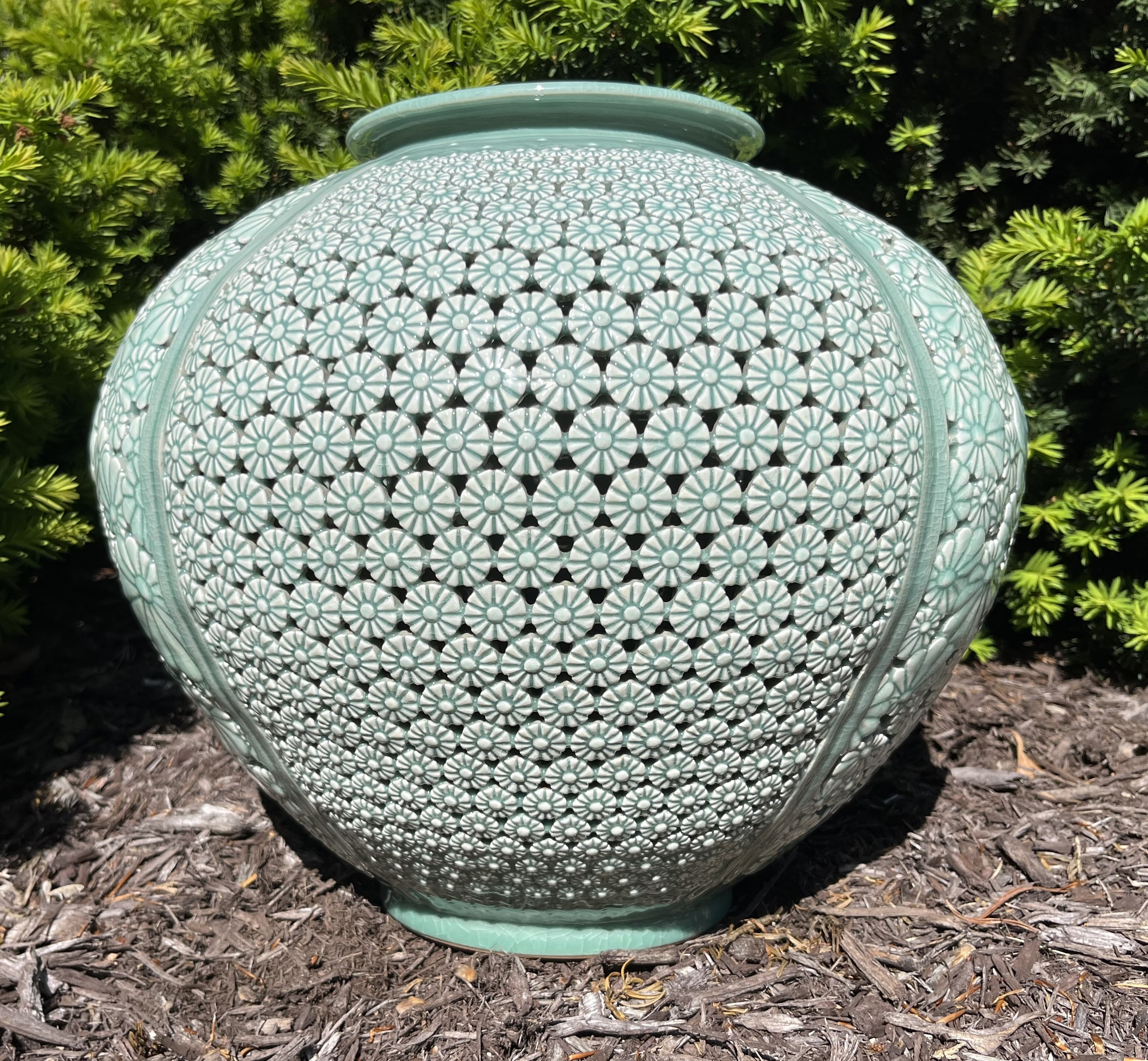
Double-openwork celadon moon jar with chrysanthemums based upon Goryeo period motif by Kim.

Celadon ware was popular during Korea's earlier Goryeo period (918-1392).

- Plain celadon moon jars: The main difference between this style and Joseon period moon jar is how the kiln is operated. The celadon color appears in a reducing kiln held at temperature longer. The blue moon jar made by Kim Se-yong, that was exhibited in New York in 2023, was made in a wood-fired kiln. Whereas, most plain celadon moon jars are made in a gas-fired or electric kiln.
- Sanggam moon jars: This style employs a uniquely Korean style that inlays patterns into Goryeo wares. Traditional motifs include chrysanthemums and clouds and cranes. Modern motifs that have a basis in tradition include the 1000 crane moon jar
- Double-openwork celadon moon jars: consist of two vessels, an inner vase that provides structural support and an outer vase that is frequently carved with chrysanthemums, cranes, and dragons in the case of Yu Geun-Hyeong. Depending on the detail, a single reticulated moon jar of this style can take a month to make. Examples can be seen at:

=== Bottle moon jars ===
According to the definition of a jar, there has to be a wide opening at the top. This opening introduces asymmetry into a moon jar. Some ceramists reduce the asymmetry by closing the top of the vessel to form a small opening with a narrow neck. After the top of the vessel has been closed in this manner, a vessel should be called a bottle vase. However, some ceramists call this style a moon jar. Examples can be seen at:

=== Contemporary moon jars ===
Some artists are producing moon jars featuring colors and motifs that have no basis in traditional Korean ceramics. Examples can be seen at: Italian architect Ico Migliore, vertically slices the moon jar shape and adds a red pattern featuring human and arrow figures.

A few artists have blended other types of traditional Korean art. Son Dae-hyeon surfaces his moon jars with mother of pearl and lacquer using a technique called najeonchilgi. Artist Jian Ryu's mother of pearl jar was presented by the Korean government to Joe Biden, and can be see at: Ryu's largest mother of pearl moon jar is 111 cm (43.7 in) in diameter.

== See also ==
- Joseon white porcelain
- Buncheong
- Korean pottery and porcelain
