= Shin Sang-ho =

South Korean ceramicist (born 1947)

- Born: 1947 (age 78–79)
- Spouse: Han Yun-sook

Korean name
- Hangul: 신상호
- Hanja: 申相浩
- RR: Sin Sangho
- MR: Sin Sangho
- Website: http://www.sanghoshin.kr/index.php

Shin Sang-ho (Korean: 신상호; born 1947) is a South Korean ceramicist. His works can be found in museums around the world especially the Shin Sang-ho Art Museum. He is the former Dean, College of Fine Arts at Hongik University in Seoul, and former Director of the Clayarch Gimhae Museum.

== Career ==
Shin Sang-ho was born in an area historically known as Yangju, and now known as Banghak-dong, Dobong-gu, Seoul, South Korea. He became interested in ceramics when he was attending classes at Hongik University's Department of Crafts. Rather than going home during a holiday, he went to a pottery in Icheon.

At that time, Icheon had no electricity or natural gas. A manually fed wood-fired kiln was the only way to fire ceramics. Further, without any modern equipment to throw clay or prepare it, Shin's initial foundation in ceramics used traditional, non-industrial techniques.

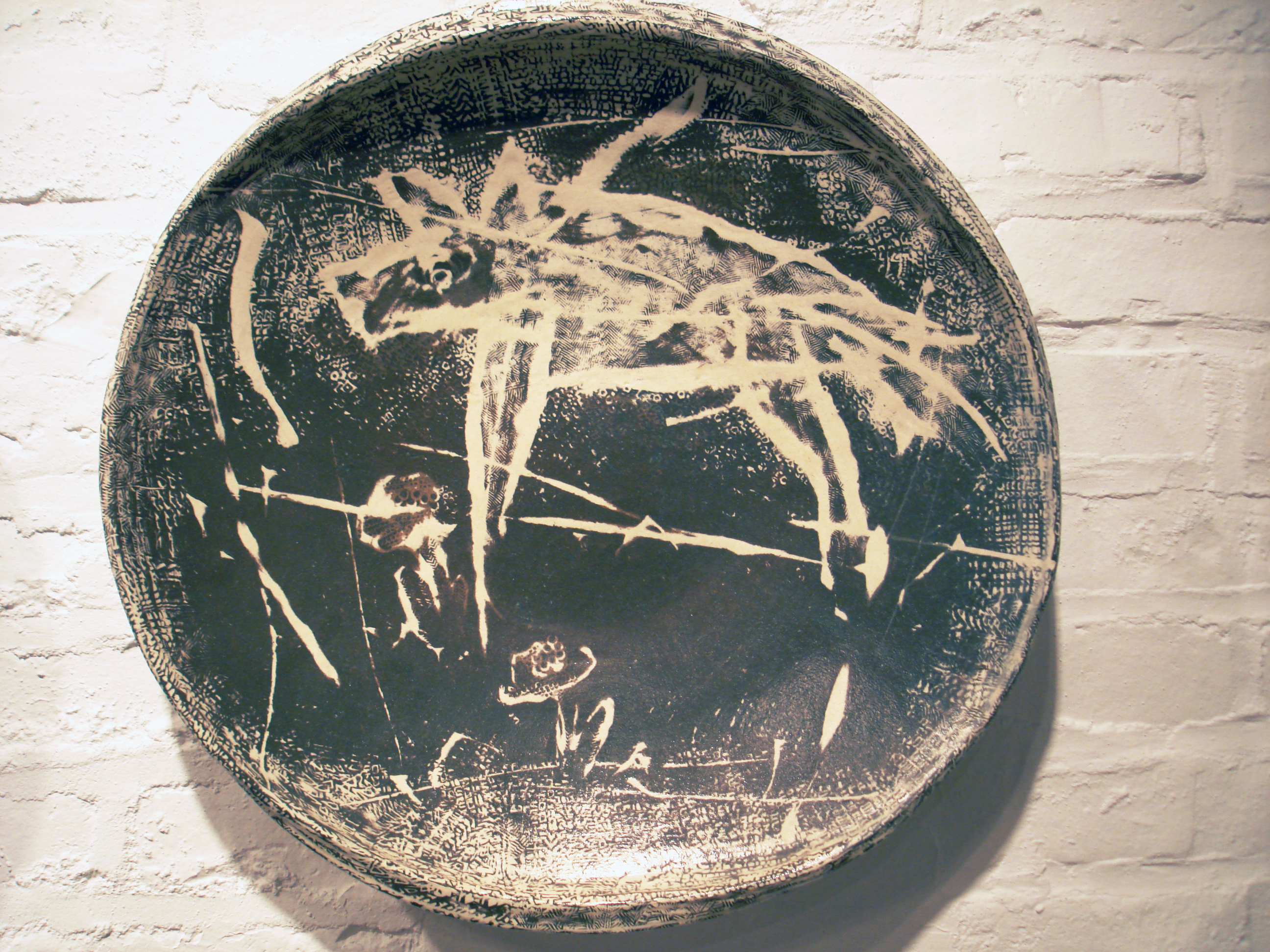
Dream Series, Buncheong Ware 1991

Starting in 1965 he began submitting his works to both the Korean Commerce and Industry Art Exhibition and Korean Industrial Artists Association Exhibition. He was awarded a bronze medal in 1968.

1973 solo exhibitions in Japan including Tokyo, Osaka, Sendai, Yamagata, and Mitsukoshi Department Store where he received an award from the Culture and Information Commissioner.

In 1976 Shin settled near the city of Yangju. He continues to live there, and has built a home, guest house, studio and museum.

In 1978 he received the Chairman's award at Korea's National Folk Art Competition.

In 1979 Shin was part of a government team that traveled internationally to learn about ceramic production and bring the technology back to South Korea.

During the 1980s he became a lecturer in the Applied Art Department of Sungshin Women's University and began working as a professor of Ceramic Art at the College of Fine Arts, Hongik University. This position eventually led to him becoming Dean of the College of Fine Arts.

In 1981, South Korean President Chun Doo-hwan visited the US to meet the president Ronald Reagan for a summit meeting. He brought a moon jar vase made by Shin who was described as being "a leading Korean ceramist".

Also in 1981, South Korea was trying to counter the influence North Korea established during the 1970s in Africa. South Korea's ambassador to Zaire, Lee Jong-eop, noticed that under the presidency of Mobutu Sese Seko, art and culture was given significant attention as a part of Zairianisation. Lee came up with the idea of sending an artist from South Korea to meet Mobutu; Shin Sang-ho was selected and subsequently Mobuto with a 60 cm tall, celadon, openwork vase as a gift.

A vase by Shin was South Korea's official gift to Prince Charles and Lady Dinner Spencer at their wedding in 1982. One news report described the vase as among the top five gifts the couple had received.

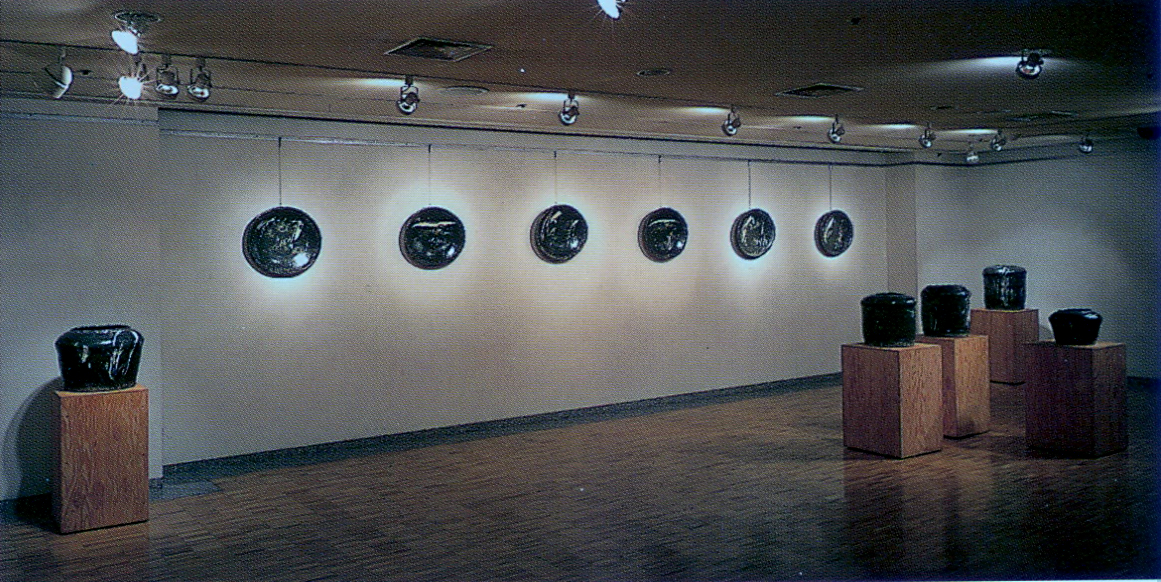
Display of Dream Series 1991

In 1986 then Korean President Chun Doo-hwan and his wife presented Queen Elizabeth II two of Shin's vases.

The "Dream" series (1995) was one of his first exhibits to gain international recognition. This series features traditional Asian vessel shapes and buncheong glazes decorated with abstract patterns reminiscent of Asian calligraphy or ink wash paintings.

In 2002, “The Dream of Africa” series, that depicts animals using bold colors and patterns, was inspired by his trips to Africa and passion for African indigenous art.

In the 1990s Shin began developing "fired painting" tiles used as a means to apply ceramic arts to commercial architecture. In 2000, a particularly large example was installed within the overhead covered walkway connecting the Seoul JW Marriott Hotel.

In 2022 the National Museum of Modern and Contemporary Art presented an exhibition titled "Prayer for Life: Special Exhibition of Korean Polychrome Painting" that featured Shin's "Totem" series.

In 2023, Shin's "Tree of Life" series and "Book of Revelation" series, that continue his interest in two dimensional ceramics were scheduled for their first public display in London.

== Clayarch Gimhae Museum ==
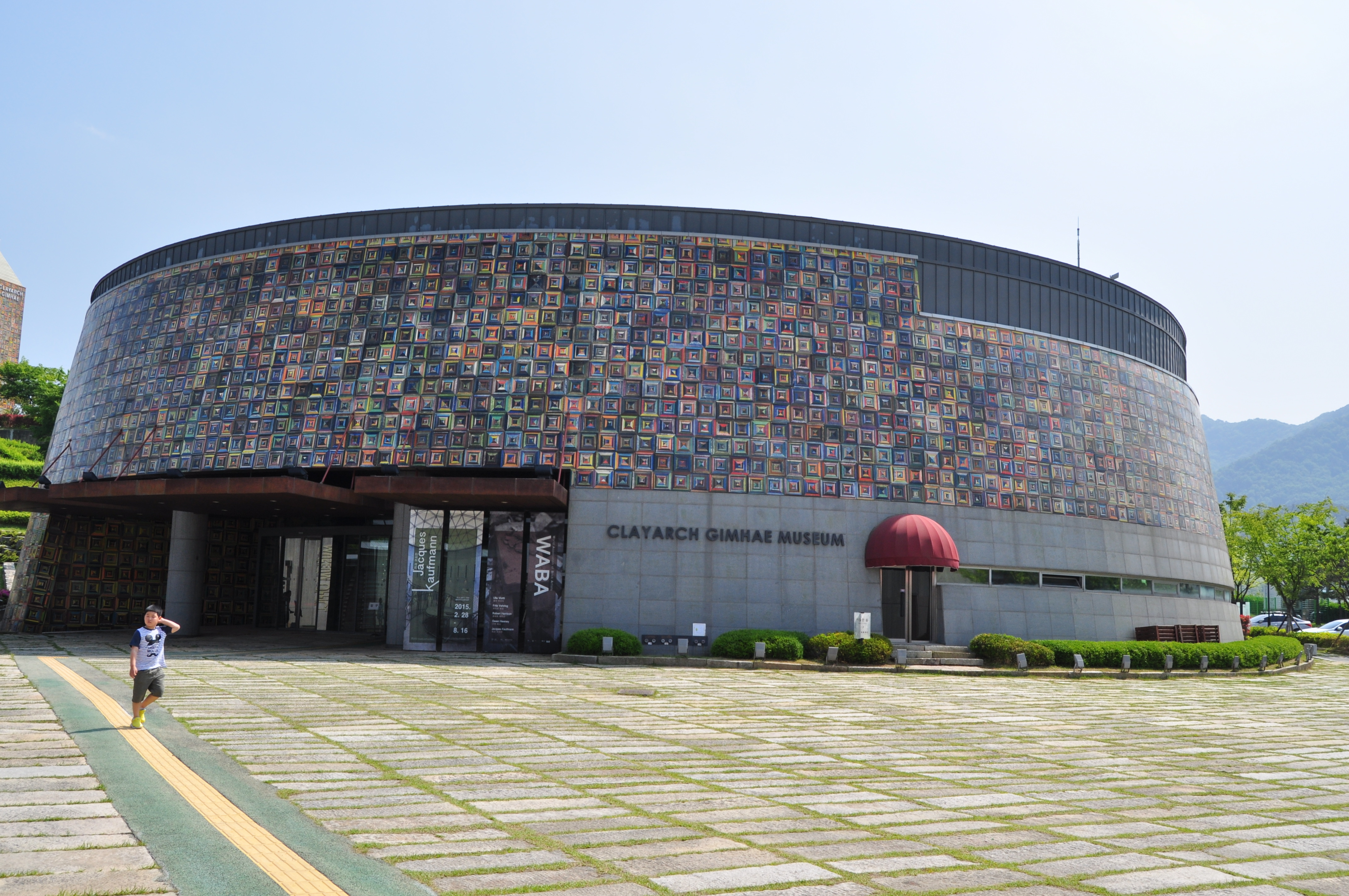
Clayarch Gimhae Museum with 5,000 fired painting tiles by Shin Sang-ho on exterior walls

The name of the Clayarch Gimhae Museum (클레이아크김해미술관) comes from the two words clay and architecture. It opened on March 24, 2006 with Shin Sang-ho serving as Artistic Director. I The exterior of the building is covered in approximately 5,000 fired painting tiles by Shin Sang-ho. Each tile is 48 cm square and were handcrafted at Bugok pottery. The tiles are not permanently fixed to the building. Instead, they are supported on an aluminium frame and can be rearranged to change the appearance of the building.

In 2020, the museum's design was awarded with a gold medal in Asia's largest design contest.

== Style ==
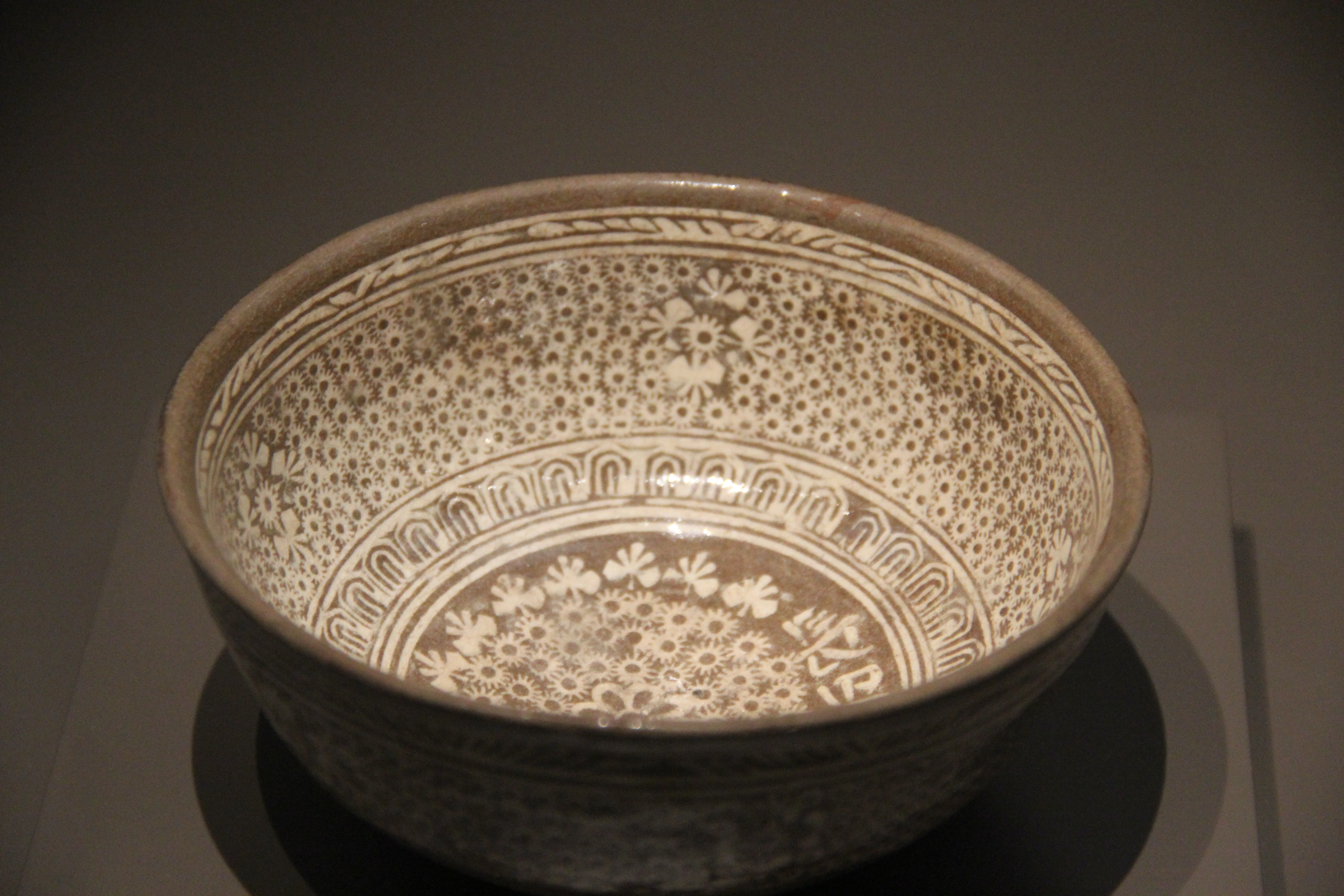
Joseon Period buncheong bowl similar to reproductions by Shin for the Japanese market.

Shin Sang-ho's style has evolved over his long career. This, may in part be owing to his philosophy of not recreating anything he has already made. When he was working in Icheon, his earliest works were similar to traditional inlayed celadon Goryeo ware called sanggam. As his skill level increased, he began creating more intricate celadon openwork and at least a few double-openwork pieces.

Shin began producing a large amount of buncheong wares similar to wares produced in the Joeson Period. These works are characterized by simple shapes and earthy colors. This style shift was likely in response to Japanese demand for traditional Japanese tea ware they call mishima.

Around this period he also began producing a style of pottery that was mostly similar to Joeson white porcelain. The moon jar vase presented to US president Ronald Reagan in 1981 was made in this style. This may not have been his first works in pure white porcelain. His more difficult singe and double-openwork pieces featured sanggam style inlays appear to have been made after returning to South Korea and fired in the gas kiln he brought back from Japan.

Over his career, Shin has made several styles of moon jars: blue and white moon jars; modern moon jars; plain celadon moon jars; sanggam moon jars; and double-openwork celadon moon jars. One critic wrote he 'epitomized the uniquely Korean aesthetic sensibilities, with free-flowing and generous forms in order to instill a contemporary touch.' Shin's departure from Korean sensibilities to becoming a ‘problematic figure’ in the Korean ceramics world has been traced to 1984. That was the year he met 'modern' ceramists when he began teaching at the University of Connecticut.

In Tatsuo Matsuyama's book, Portrait of a Modern Ceramic Artist, Shin was listed as one of the 66 most influential ceramists who shaped modern ceramics. He has also been deemed a heretic, for not keeping with what some critics considered to be proper Korean ceramics.

== Personal life ==
Shin Sang-ho is married to Han Yun-sook who made her own line of pottery from porcelain. The couple raised two daughters, both of whom continue the family association with art. Shin an avid collector. A large exhibition in London of African art was particularly influential. He was so enchanted by the original vitality of the works that he almost lived in the exhibition hall. Since then, he has frequently traveled to Africa. His home is filled with hundreds of artifacts collected from Africa. In 2022 Shin reported he was in talks with Yangju City to donate his extensive collection of personal art as well as collected art.

Shin is the chairman of Camp Red Cloud Design Cluster Creation Working Group. The group is working to utilize the property and buildings that were transferred from the United States Forces Korea to the government of South Korea. Shin's goal is to convert the property into a multi-use cultural space for galleries, artist residences, a school for design and art, and area to host art fairs.

== Signature ==
When working in celadon, Shin typically signed his works by first engraving his stylized signature in thin clear lines and curves. The engraved area was then filled in with a darker clay before firing. When working in buncheong, Shin typically signed his works with a wider deep engraving that was left unfilled. Many buncheong works are signed near the foot instead of the bottom.

== Selected collections ==
Shin's work is in the permanent collections of:

- The National Museum of Contemporary Art (South Korea)
- Museum of Korea University in Seoul (South Korea)
- Museum of Hong-Ik University in Seoul (South Korea)
- Ho-Am Art Museum in Yong-in (South Korea)
- Everson Museum in Syracuse (United States)
- Victoria and Albert Museum in London (United Kingdom)
- The British Museum in London (United Kingdom)
- Royal Ontario Museum in Ontario (Canada)
- Royal Museum of Mariemont in Brussels (Belgium)
- Cleveland Museum of Art in Cleveland (United States)
- Seattle Art Museum (United States)
- Sèvres - Cité de la céramique (national ceramics museum in Sèvres, France)
- Royal Collection Trust (Collection of Queen Elizabeth II, UK)
- LongHouse Reserve, East Hampton, New York (United States)
- Jordan Schnitzer Museum of Art in Eugene, Oregon (United States)
