= Kim Se-yong (ceramist) =

South Korean ceramist (born 1946)

Master Kim Se-yong
- Born: 1946 (age 79–80)
- Notable work: Openwork ceramics
- Style: Celadon
- Spouse: Lee Soon-i
- Children: 2
- Awards: Korean Master Craftsman for Ceramics
- Website: www.kceramicmaster.com

Kim Se-yong (Korean: 김세용, Hanja: 世昌 金世龍; born 1946) is a South Korean ceramist and C.E.O of Sechang Artistic Ceramic Institute. He is known for his celadon style on ceramics based upon the traditional Goryeo wares. Kim was a former Professor of Ceramic Art at Chungkang College of Cultural Industries, and currently resides and works in Icheon, South Korea.

== Biography ==
Kim studied civil engineering at Gyeonggi Technical High School. He became interested in ceramics during a school field trip to the National Museum of Korea.

In 1966, Kim began working at a pottery in Icheon. At that time, Icheon had about 100 potters working in 7 to 8 potteries. The pottery he joined specialized in Goryeo ware celadon.

Within a year of starting work in Icheon, he became head of the pottery sculpture room.

Kim's was called into military service for South Korea during the Vietnam war. He returned to Icheon in 1972 joining a pottery owned by Shin Sang-ho. He also trained under celadon ceramist Namgok Ko Seung-su (b. 1913).

In 1978, he became independent, and built his own kiln. In 1979, he established the Sechang Ceramic Research Institute. It was an auspicious time. The years from the late 1970's through mid 1990's were one of the peak periods of celadon production owing to an influx of wealthy Japanese tourists who bought souvenirs in Icheon's and Seoul's pottery shops.

In 2002 he was designated the 349th Korean Master Craftsman by the government of South Korea, and the first master to be designated for celadon ceramics.

In 2006, Kim held a solo exhibition titled "From Earth to Light". He considers it to be the turning point in his life where he went from being a "major" to a "master".

However, this period of personal successes coincided with the 1997 Asian financial crisis and Japan's lost decades. Tourism and the market within Korea for traditional wares dropped significantly.

In 2015 Kim was awarded as being Korea's Master of the year.

In 2017 he received the Order of Cultural Merit of the Republic of Korea.

As of 2023 he has received 22 awards, including the Garland Medal of the Order of Cultural Merit and participated in more than 110 exhibitions in South Korea and around the world.

== Style ==
Kim's works are inspired by ancient celadon wares produced during the Goryeo period (918-1392). However, rather than simply replicating historical patterns, he adopted the Korean philosophy known by the four-character idiom "Beop Go Chang Sin" (법고창신 法古創新). This philosophy was preached by 18th century philosopherPak Chiwŏn. It means to create something new that has been derived from the old.

Kim produces pottery through a laborious, manual process. After digging and sieving the clay, he allows it to age for up to 5 years. It is then kneaded by hand and foot Kim claims, "Using feet allows finer and subtler control of the detail."

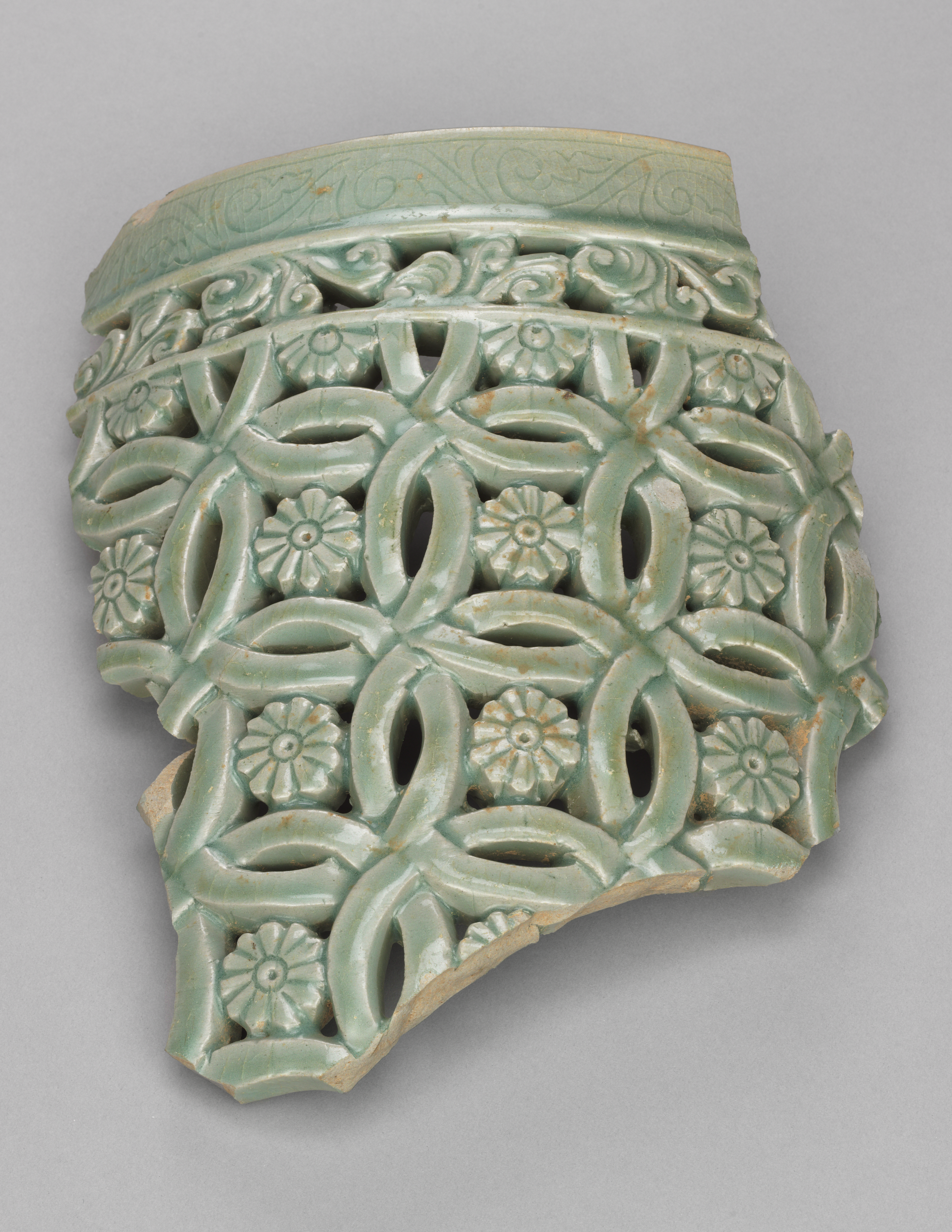
Openwork fragment from the Goryeo period with dull chrysanthemum flowers against celadon background.

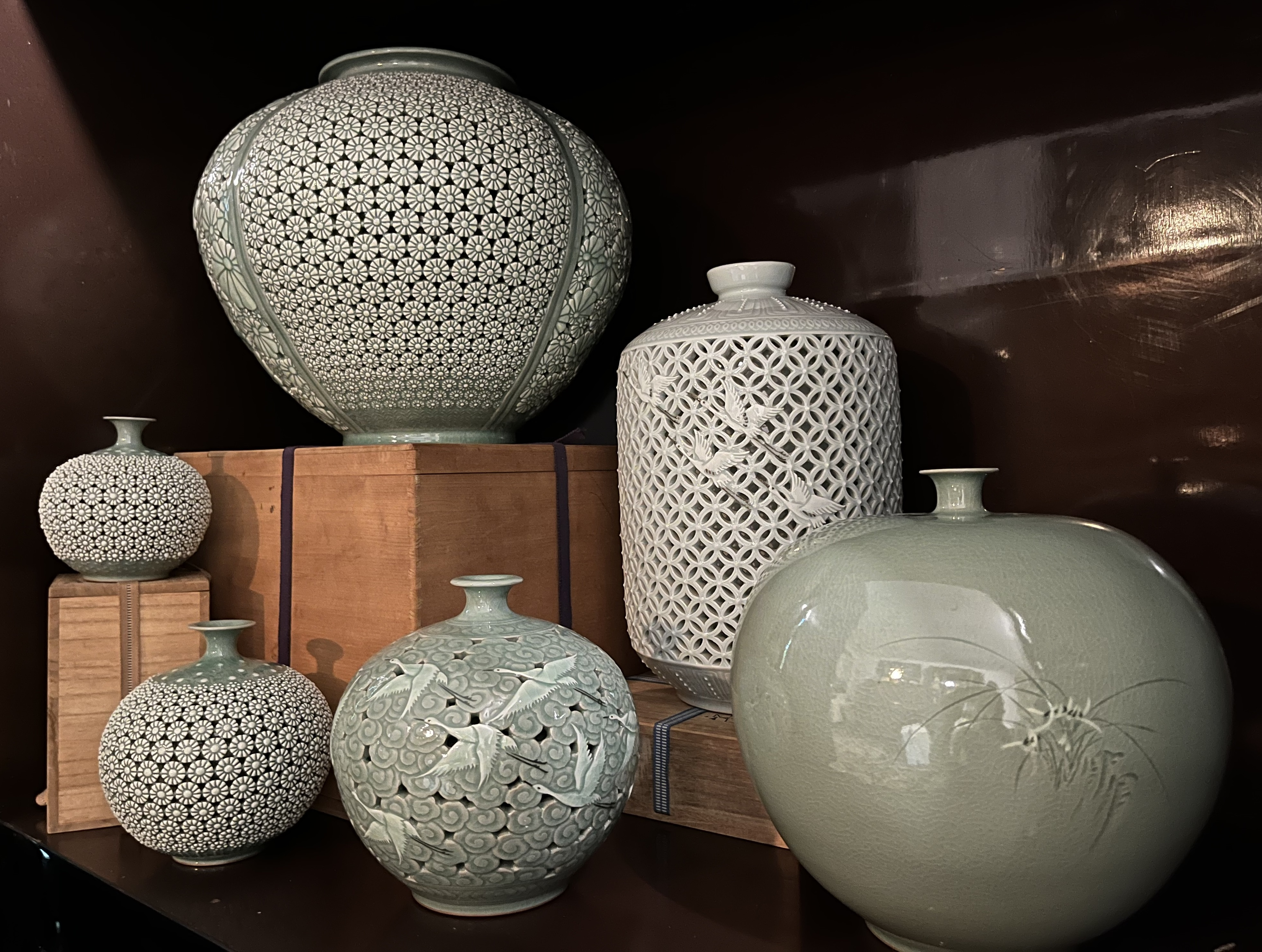
Collection of reticulated and one bottle-neck moon jars by Kim Se-yong

Some of his works depict the four gracious plants commonly referred to as the Four Gentlemen (Sagunja 사군자). Other of his works focus on just one. Two frequent studies in sanggam (inlaid celadon) are a single branch of a plum tree laden with ume blossoms and an orchid.

To create landscapes, he uses the sgraffito technique. A frequent theme is a landscape scene featuring a rocky, forested mountain range covered in snow, with traditional buildings that have roofs laden under a heavy snowfall.

Kim's celadon moon jars are more in keeping with traditional Joseon period moon jars that were also thrown on a manual kick wheel and fired in a wood-fired kiln.

== Personal life ==
Kim met his wife, Lee Sae-dam, at the pottery he first joined where she worked as a potter.

== Sechang Artistic Ceramic Institute and teachings ==
Kim founded the Sechang Artistic Ceramic Institute (세창예술도자연구소) in Icheon to disseminating his findings and train potters.

== Major solo exhibitions ==
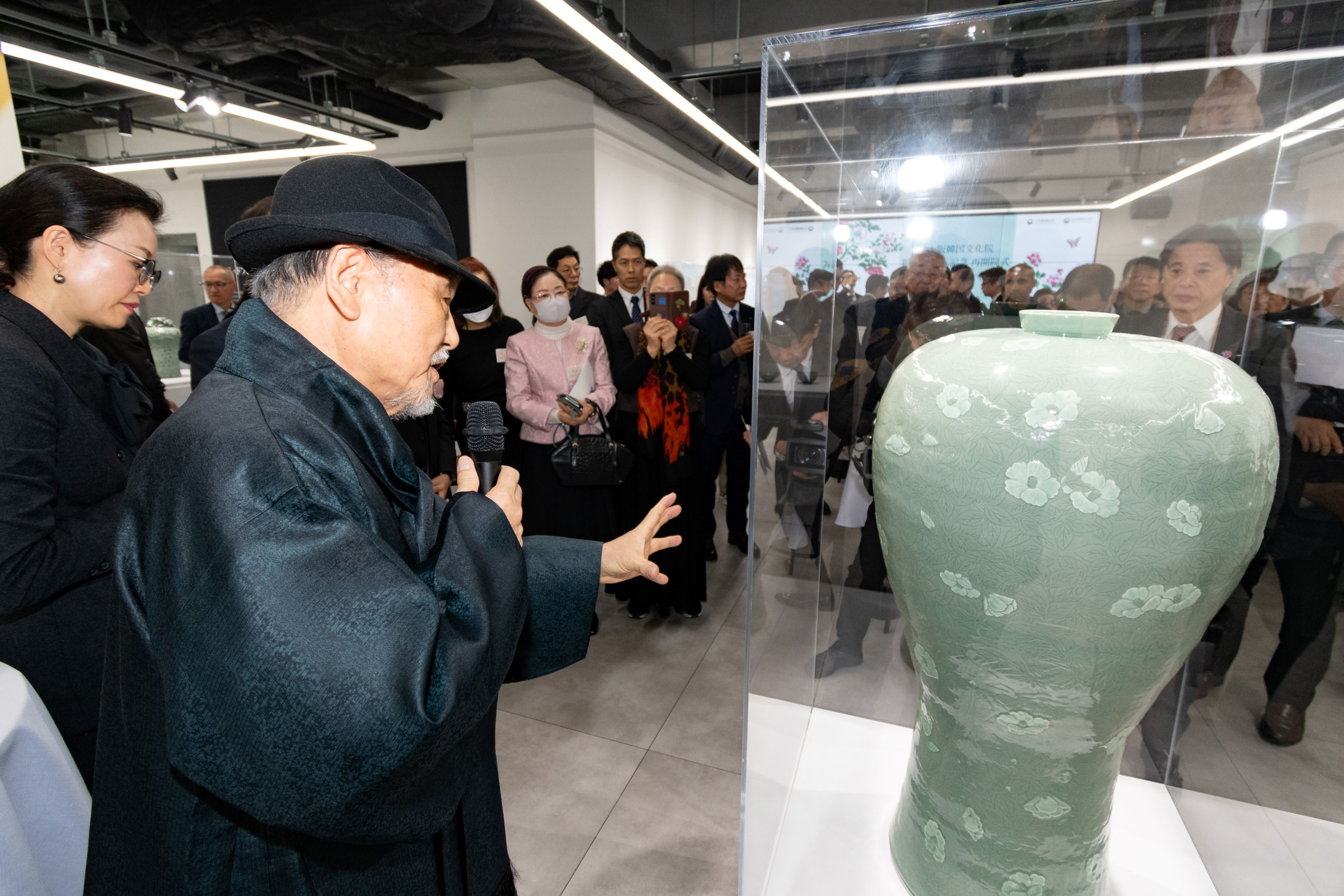
Master Kim Se-yong in Osaka Japan explaining his celadon vase

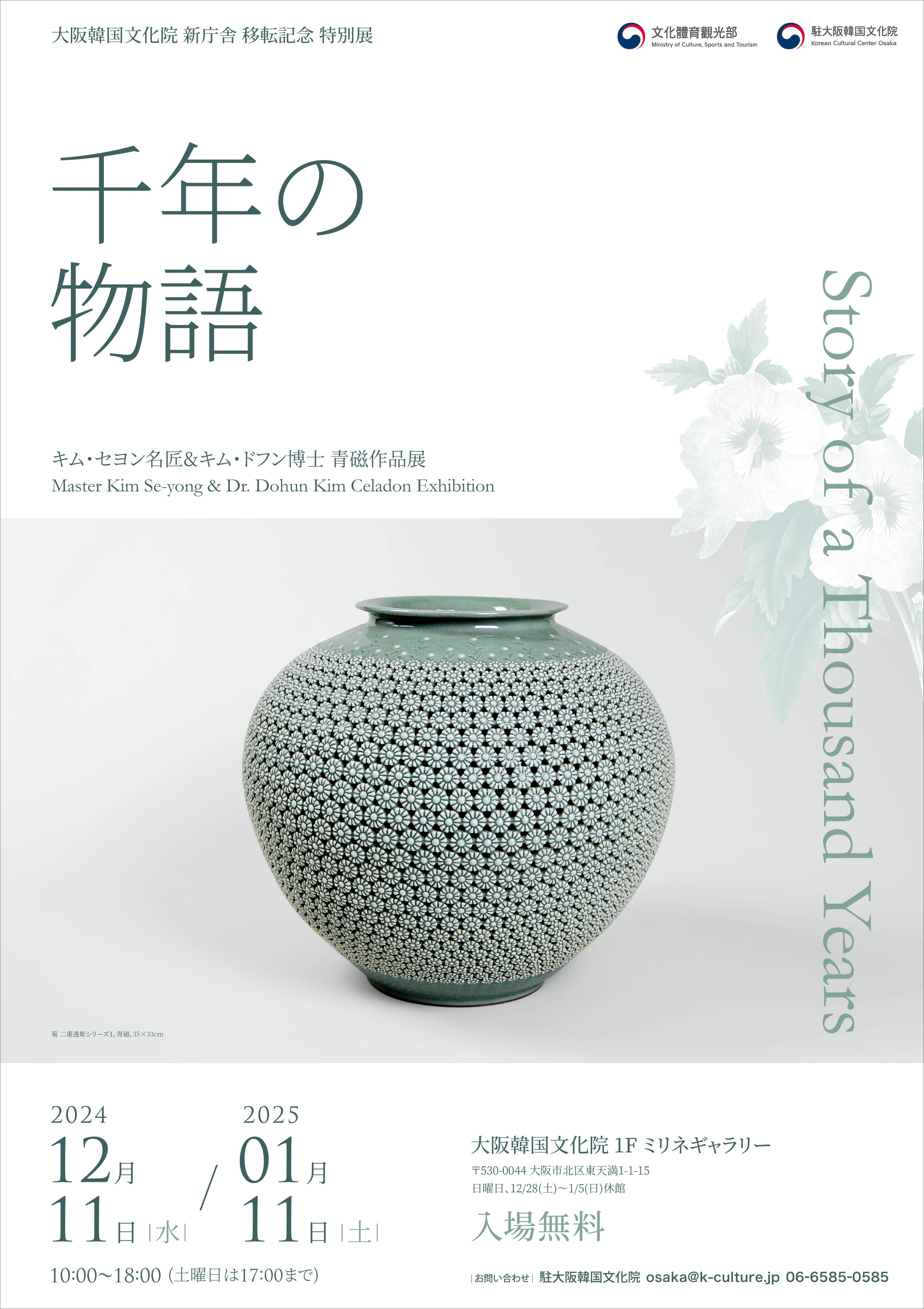
Exhibition flyer for Osaka Japan December 2024

2006 From Earth to Light, Icheon City, South Korea

2023 Story of a Thousand Years: Master of Goryeo Celadon, Los Angeles and New York City

2024 "Royal Celadons" by Sechang Kim Se-Yong and Kim Dohun Kate Oh Gallery New York City

2024-2025 A Thousand Years of Story, Osaka Korean Cultural Center
