= Buncheong =

Type of traditional Korean ceramics

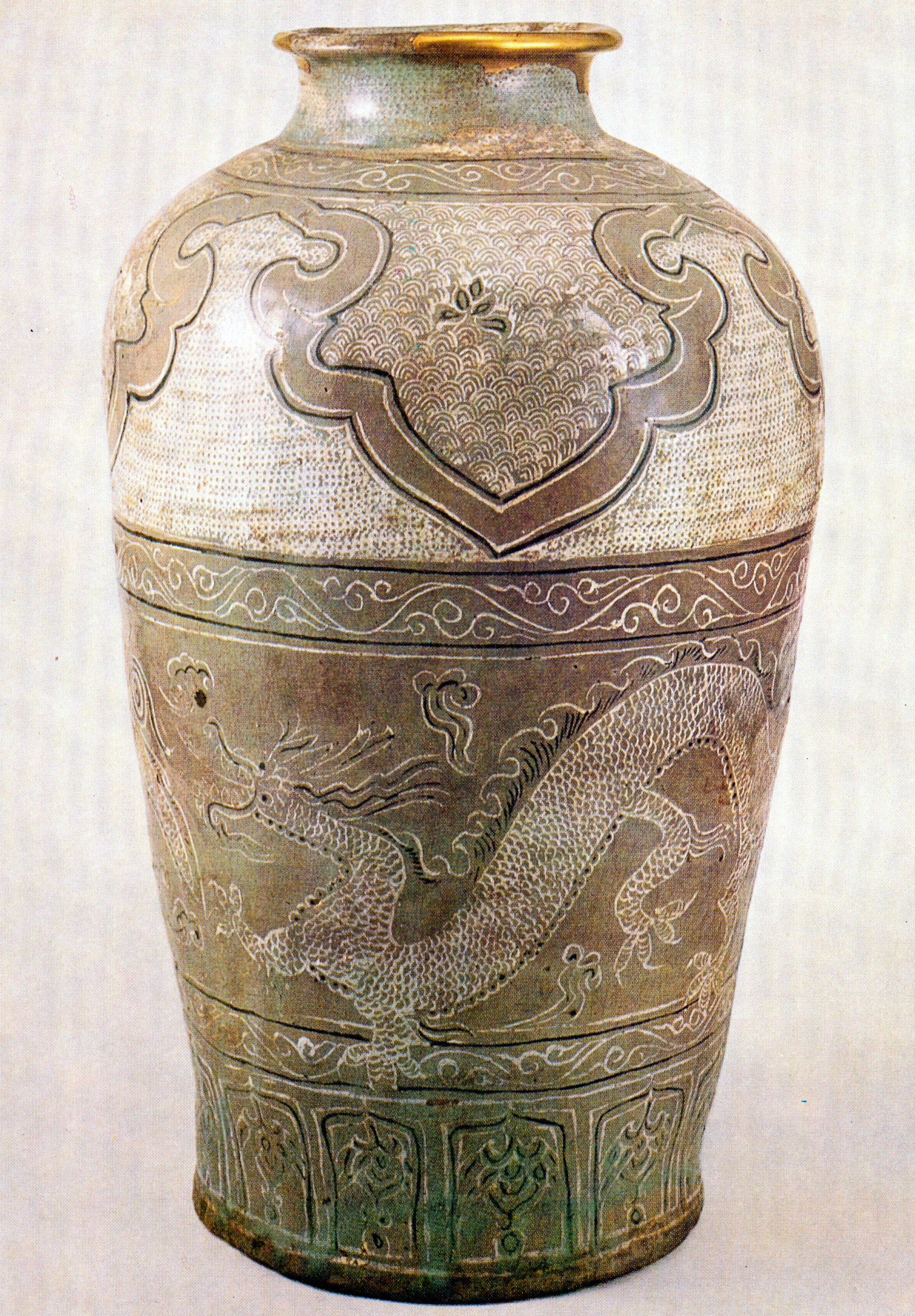
- Buncheong Ware with Inlaid Dragon and Stamped Design, Joseon Dynasty, National Treasure No. 259

Korean name
- Hangul: 분청사기
- Hanja: 粉靑沙器
- RR: buncheongsagi
- MR: punch'ŏngsagi

Buncheong (Korean: 분청), or punch'ong, ware is a traditional form of Korean stoneware, with a blue-green tone. Pieces are coated with white slip (ceramics), and decorative designs are added using a variety of techniques. This style originated in the 15th century and continues in a revived form today.

== History ==
Buncheong is a contemporary term for a specific type of traditional Korean stoneware that developed in the 15th century, during the Joseon period, as Goryeo celadon techniques and subject matter evolved. Buncheong ware developed from the earlier Goryeo celadon inlay technique called sanggam and rapidly distinguished itself. In contrast to the refined elegance of Goryeo celadon, buncheong is designed to be natural, unassuming, and practical. This style is characterized by its pale blue-green color and decorative techniques, which involved shaping the clay and then covering it in white slip (ceramics) and decorating it by carving, stamping, and brushwork.

Buncheong style initially lasted for a little over a century in Korea. In its heyday, buncheong ware pieces were exported to Japan by practitioners of the Japanese tea ceremony. The Japanese invasions in the 1590s caused extensive economic devastation to Joseon-era Korea, including the development of the ceramic industry. Hundreds of Korean ceramic artisans were killed or abducted, and taught the Japanese to produce their own porcelain, causing the simplification and decline of native Korean ceramics. It all but disappeared from Korea after the 16th century, partially due to the popularity of Joseon white porcelain. While the production of buncheong ware in Korea declined and was outpaced by porcelain, stoneware featuring buncheong-derived aesthetic elements continued to be produced in Japan, where it became known as Mishima pottery, simultaneously with porcelain. In Japan the two were seen as separate forms of expression, neither substituting for the other.

Buncheong style continued to be used in Japan as tea ceremony ware, but only experienced a revival in Korea in the 20th century. Also during the 20th century, elements of buncheong's aesthetics reached Europe and the United States through Bernard Leach, Shoji Hamada, and other artists who were knowledgeable in Asian ceramic traditions. Buncheong continues to inspire artists, and both Japanese and Korean artists work with buncheong techniques.

The National Museum of Korea houses a large collection of buncheong ware, as well as the Leeum, Samsung Museum of Art in Seoul.

== Characteristics ==
Buncheong is characterized by the use of dark, iron-bearing clay covered in white slip and a clear glaze. Various methods can be used to apply decoration and pigment on the slip or draw through the slip to reveal the dark clay beneath it.

Buncheong is distinct from other forms of Korean ceramic ware, such as Goryeo celadon and Joseon white porcelain, in various ways which are more related to aesthetics and underlying sentimentality than to technique. Its unconventional beauty is easily distinguished from the elegance of its celadon precursor and the simplicity of white porcelain, setting it apart as a uniquely Korean style. Korean ceramics generally featured only one primary pigment and favored more subtle expression than those found in China and Japan, and the subject matter and composition of buncheong was more whimsical and lyrical, reminiscent of modern abstract works, with free-spirited decorative motifs. These motifs were originally derived from Goryeo era celadon but changed dramatically as buncheong ware developed throughout the 15th and 16th centuries. Flowers, such as peonies, chrysanthemums, and lotuses, as well as animals, both real and imagined, were important design elements and motifs in buncheong ware, as they were important symbols related to belief systems such as Confucianism.

Buncheong incorporated carving and stamping as decorative elements, slip inlay, sgraffito, brushwork, iron painting, and later brushing and sipping pieces in white slip. Regional differences in style and technique developed quickly, such as inhwa, with designs being stamped onto the surface and these stamped areas being covered with white slip; cheolhwa, applying designs with a brown underglaze to pieces covered with white slip; and johwa, a sgraffito style in which a piece is covered in white slip and designs are then etched onto the surface. As the style evolved, it reflected the changing culture surrounding it. As metals such as gold, silver, and bronze became scarce due to Ming Dynasty China's tribute demands, ceremonial vessels once made from those metals were manufactured using clay instead, copying the shapes and aesthetics of the original metal vessels. The nature of the surface decorations shifted from finer, more delicate decoration as was typical of the Goryeo period, to a looser and more abstract style which was more lively, informal, and experimental as craftsmen experienced a change in patronage to local and regional customers rather than governmental.

== Gallery ==
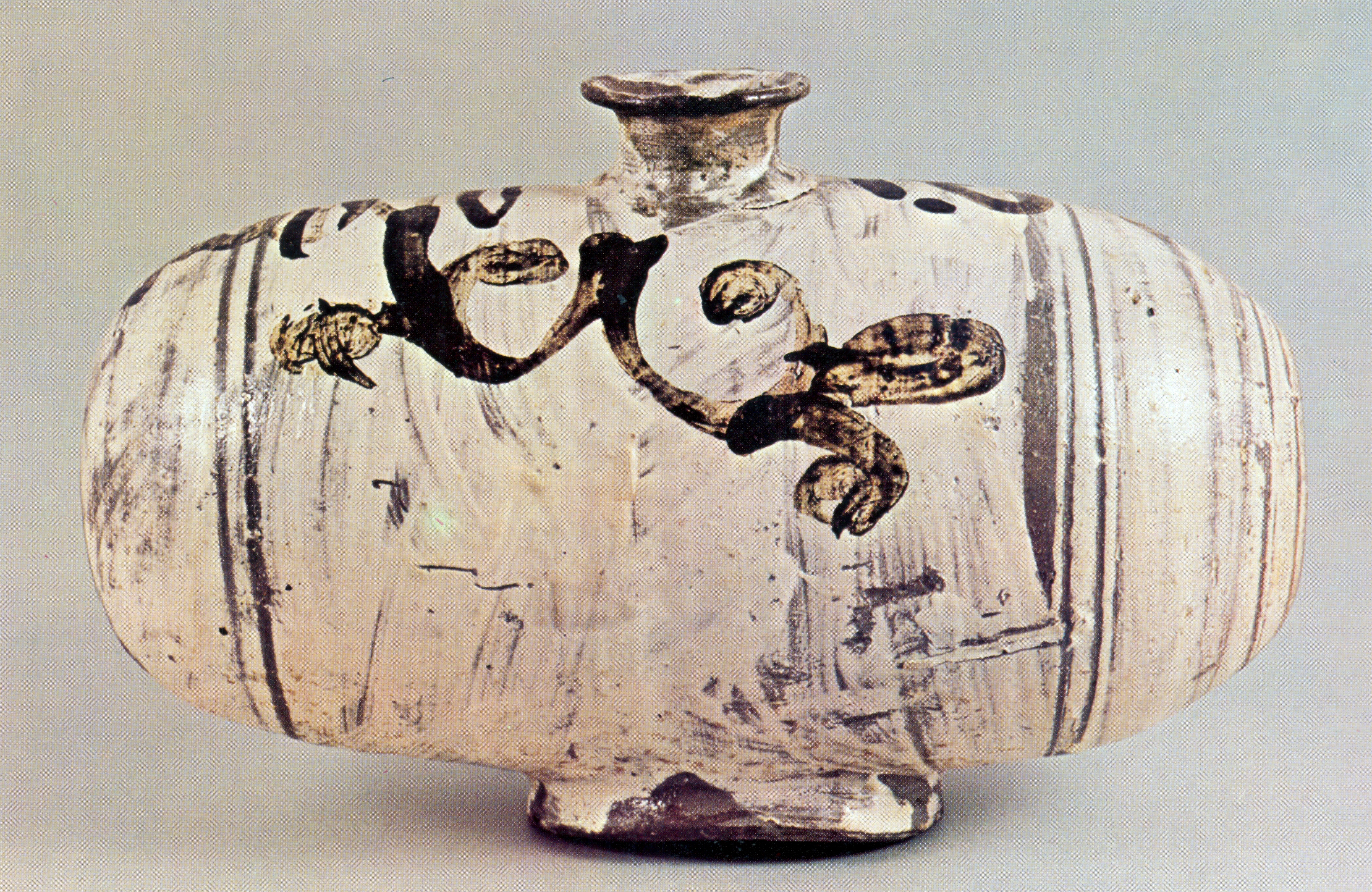
Drum-shaped bottle with iron brown decoration with arabesque design (National Treasure No. 1062)

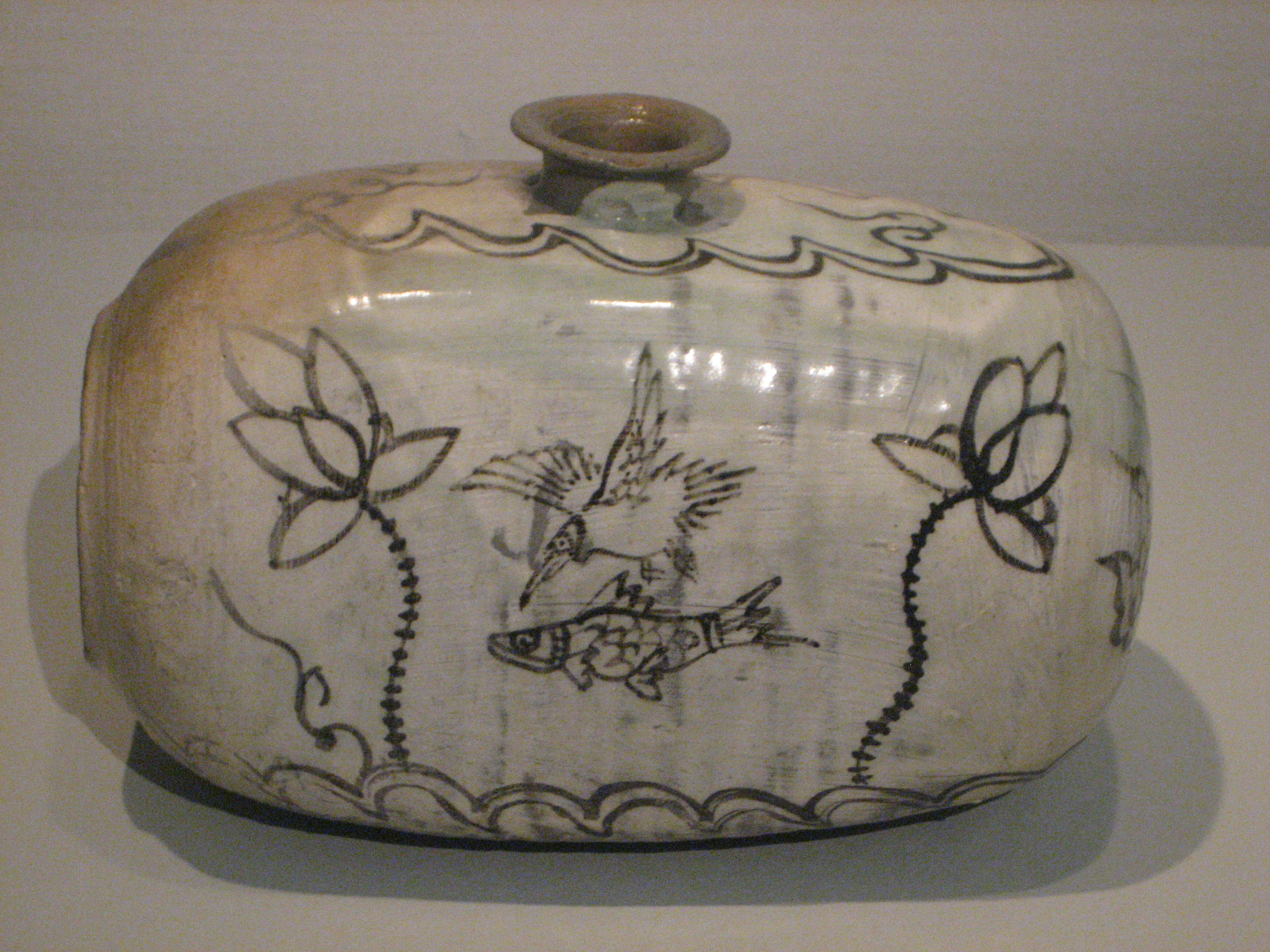
Drum-shaped bottle with decoration of fish, bird, and lotus

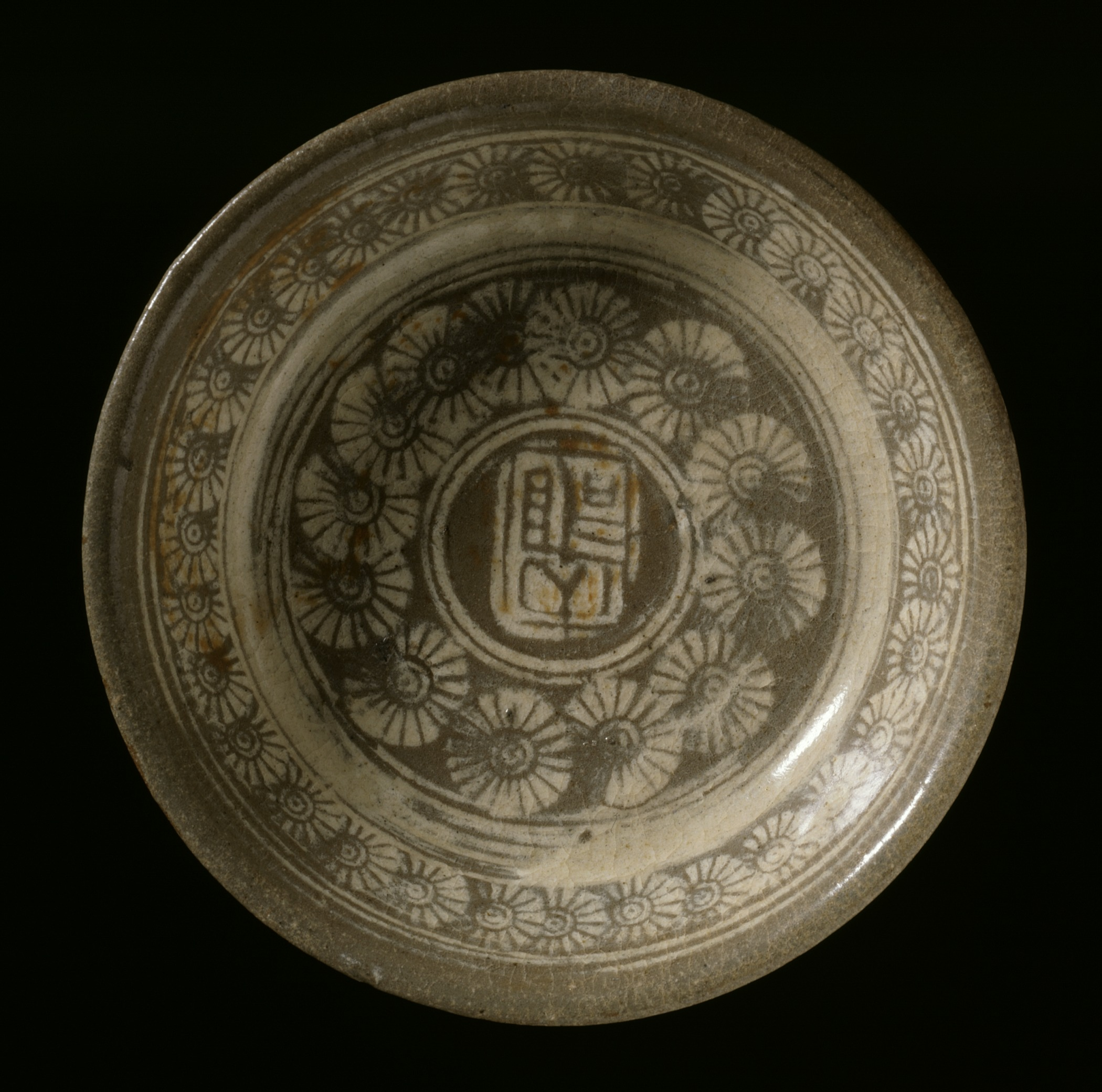
Shallow Bowl with Chrysanthemum Design

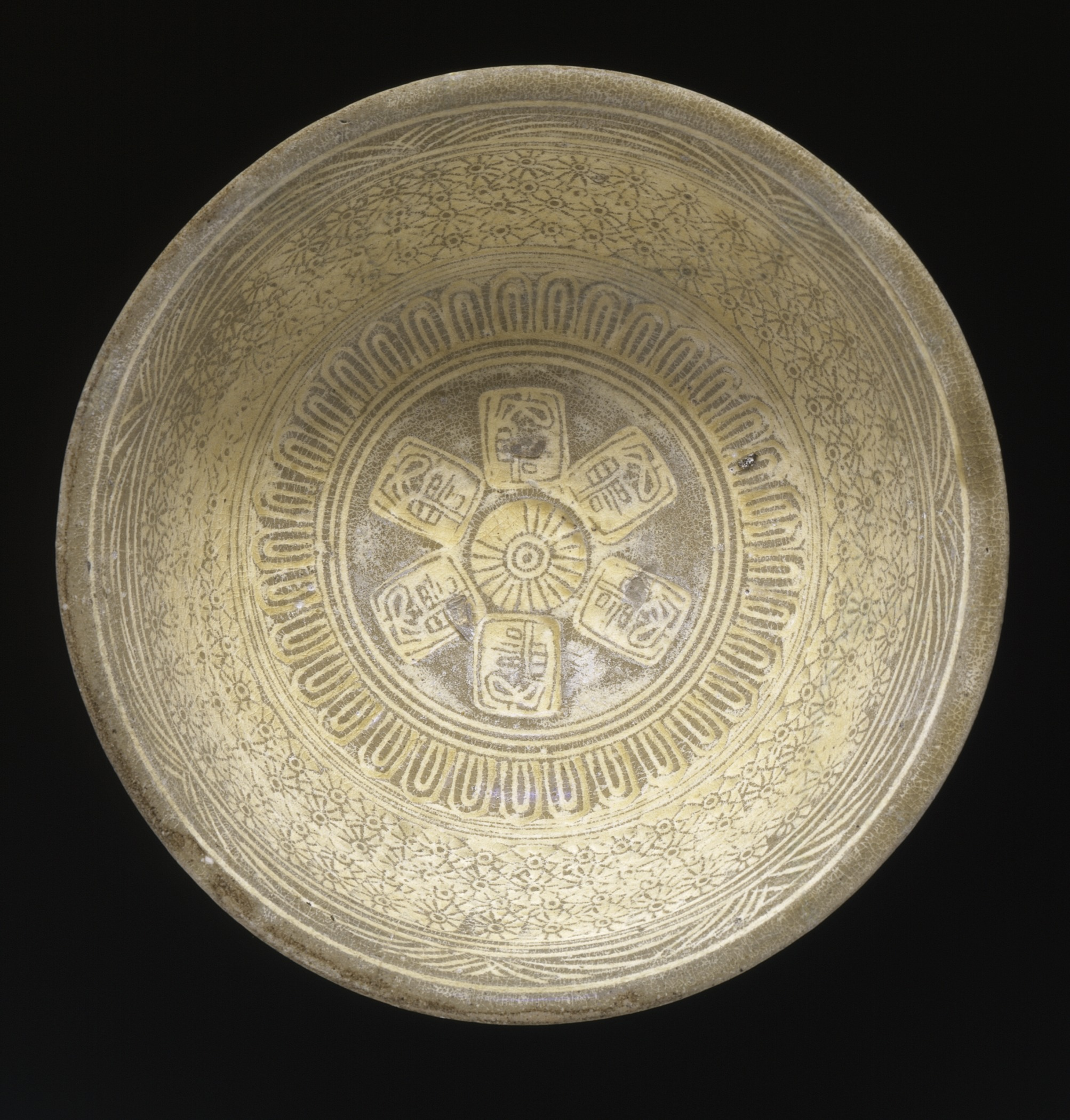
Bowl with Naeseom Inscription

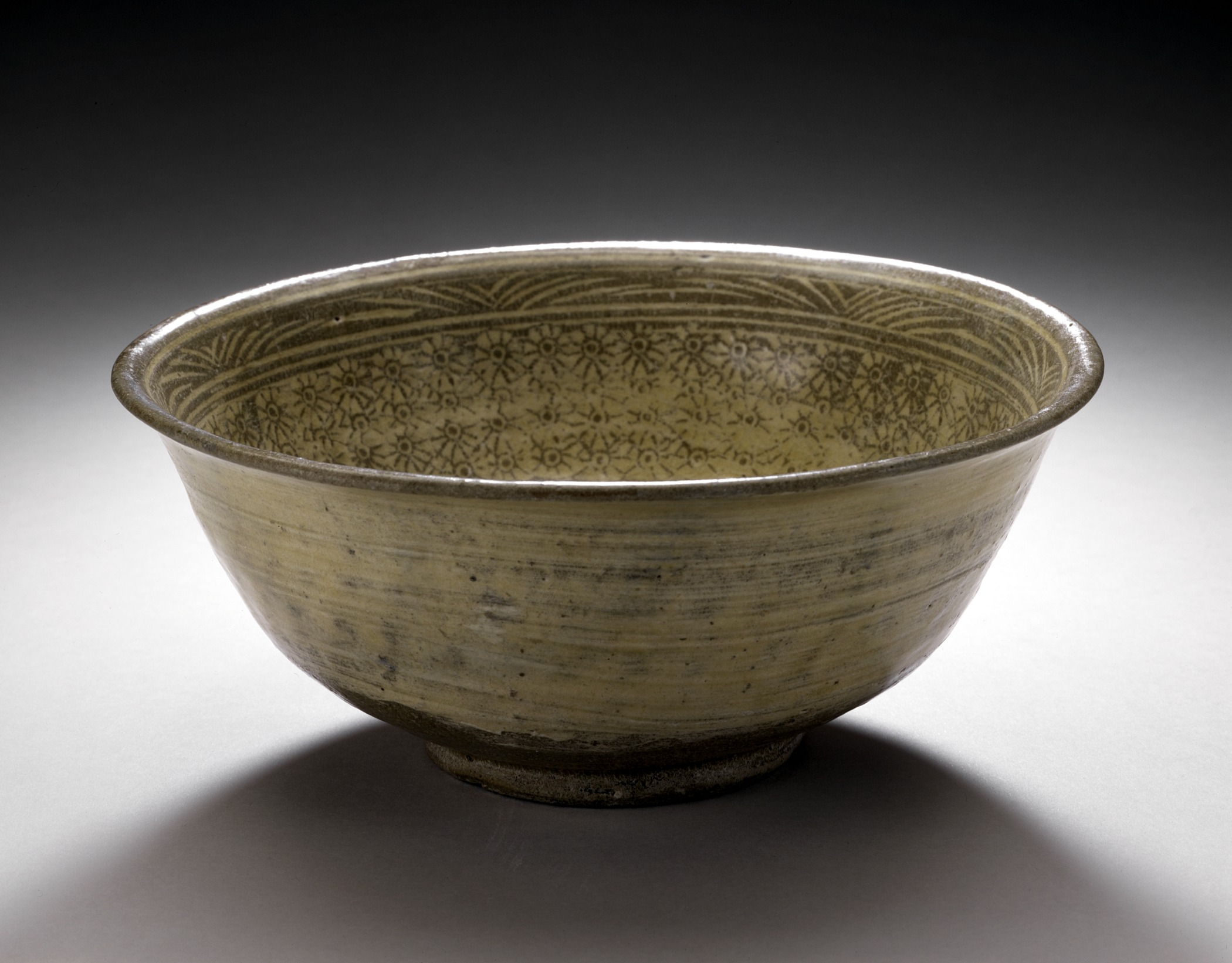
Bowl with Naeseom Inscription

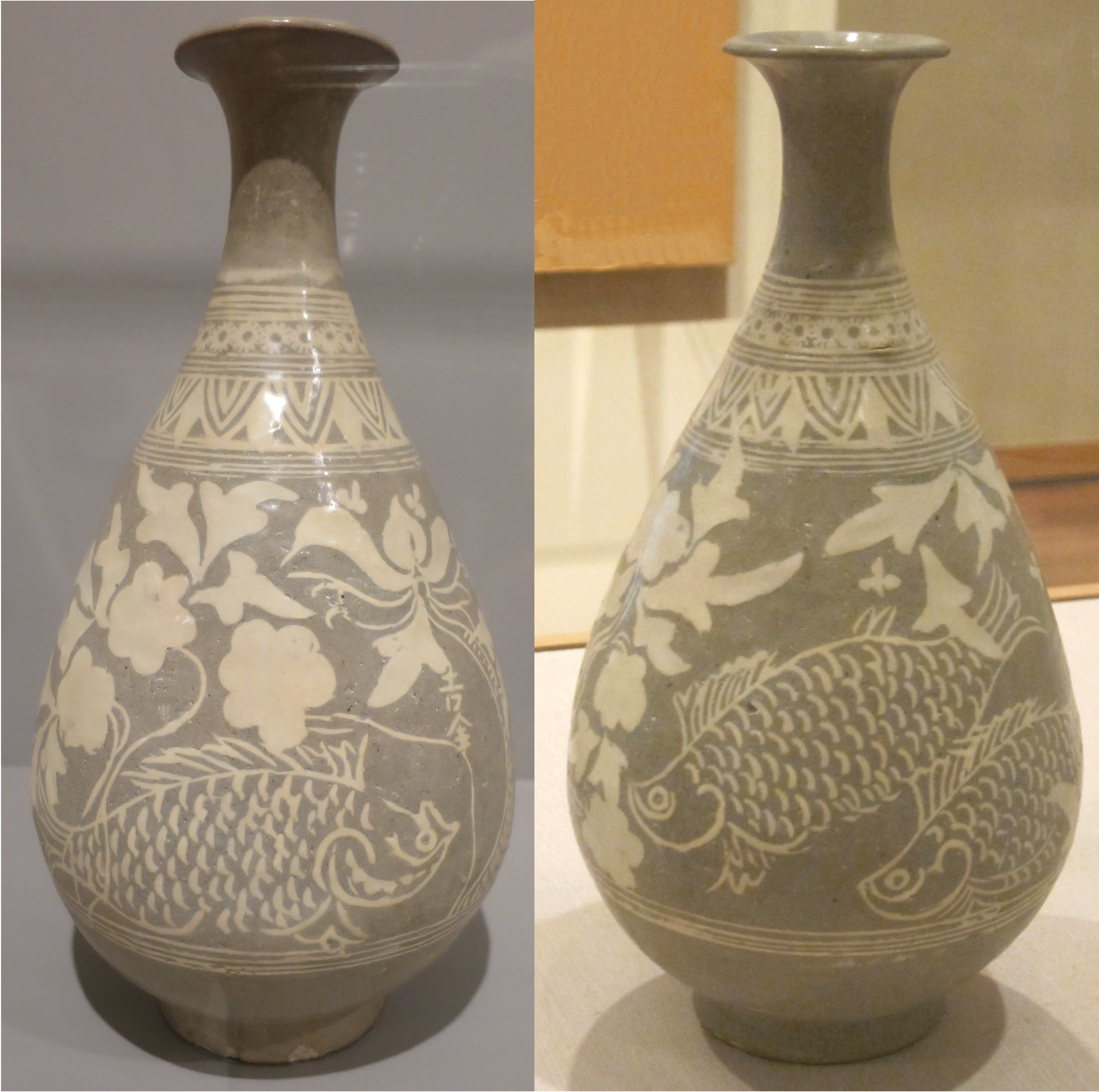

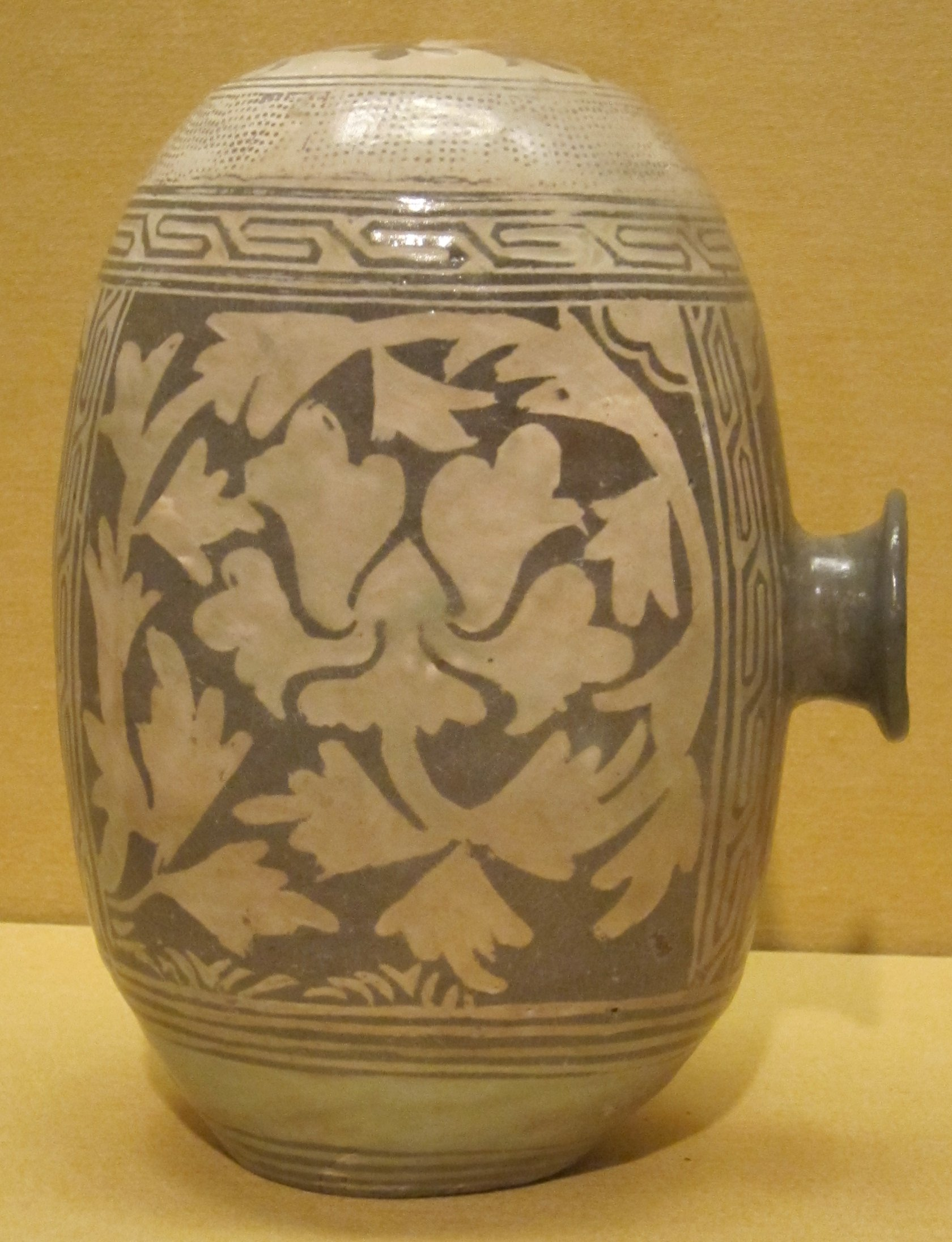

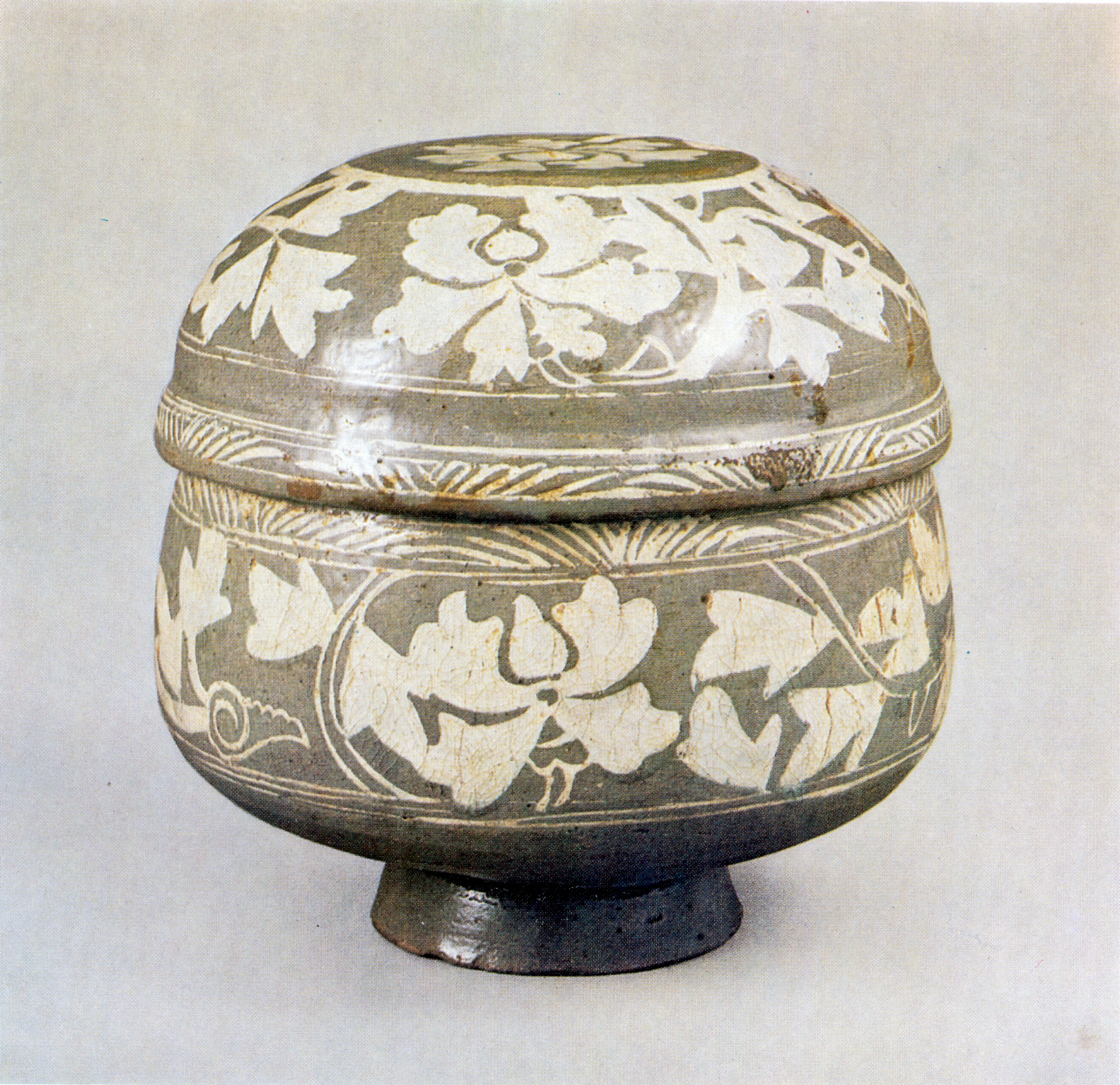

== Gallery by techniques ==
There are six main techniques in buncheong ware: guiyal, inhwa, bakji, eumgak, cheolhwa and damgeum.

guiyal technique	buncheong tea cup, casual ware	Joseon period's common people enjoyed using buncheong. Late 15th-early 16th century item.
inwha	inwha buncheong dish, stamping flowers or dots	buncheong bowl with tortoiseshell and chrysanthemums decorations
bakji	buncheong bowl inwha combined with bakji technique, peony leaves and chrysanthemum	Buncheong ceramics, national museum of Korea
eumgak	tea cup buncheong eumgak inlaid peony	fish motif are often seen since Gaya kingdom's first queen Heo came from Ayordiya, India with her family symbol, two fishes siding each other
cheolwha	buncheong's beauty of releasing is called Moowi meaning not putting efforts, opposition to a perfection	cheowha technique using iron painting
damguem	tea bowl of buncheong 16c	Buncheong rice wine Makgeoli sabal

== See also ==
- Korean pottery and porcelain
