= Joseon white porcelain =

White porcelains produced during the Joseon dynasty

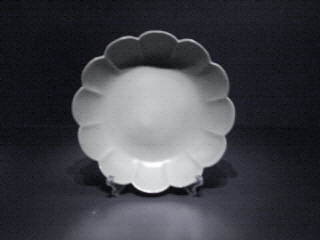
- Korean porcelain plate produced during the Joseon dynasty , 15th century AD

Korean name
- Hangul: 조선백자
- Hanja: 朝鮮白瓷
- RR: Joseonbaekja
- MR: Chosŏnbaekcha

Joseon white porcelain or Joseon baekja (Korean: 조선백자; Hanja: 朝鮮白瓷) refers to the white porcelains produced during the Joseon dynasty (1392–1910).

== History ==
White porcelains were preferred and praised over other porcelains during the time to represent Korean Confucian ethics such as frugality and pragmatism.

Baekja first made its first appearance in Korea during the Unified Silla period. Initially, baekja did not show any significant development until the end of the 14th century, when new potter's clay and glazes were introduced. After gaining significant attention towards the end of the Goryeo dynasty, production of white porcelain was promulgated by a nation-wide drive starting at the beginning of the Joseon Dynasty. The wares were often used by the king, and were of such high quality that the Ming Dynasty requested the wares as a form of tribute. Baekja made during this time was slightly bluish, and was considered to be serene and dignified, portraying the national ideals envisioned at the founding of the dynasty.

Overall, Joseon ceramics underwent numerous transformations during the five hundred-year period and is generally divided into three major periods; the early, the middle, and the late period.

Although the chronology of Joseon ceramics differs between scholars, three major events affected kiln production; the outcome of the Imjin wars, the establishment of Bunwon (분원; 分院), government-subsidized kilns at Bunwon-ri, Gwangju near Seoul in 1751, and the privatization of Bunwon in 1884.

A number of Joseon porcelain has been registered by the government as National Treasures.

== Characteristics ==
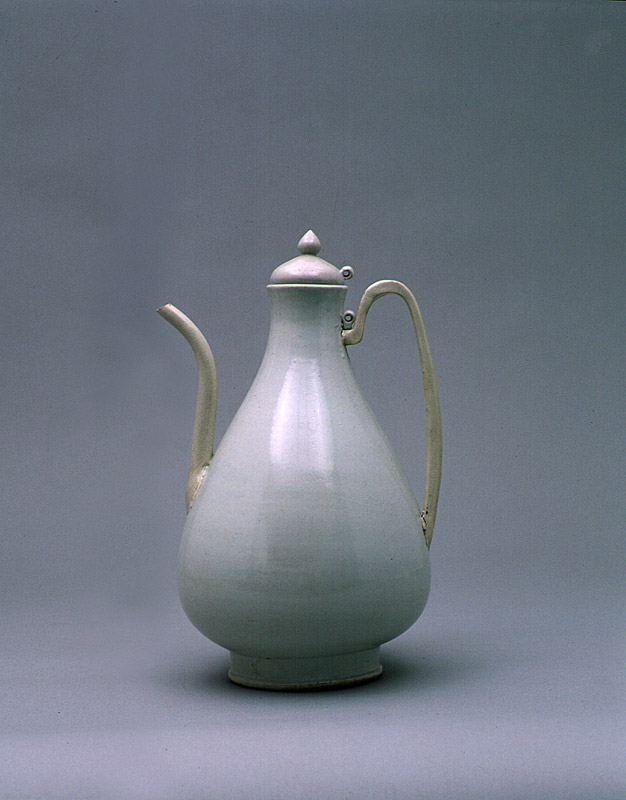
White Porcelain Bottle-shaped Ewer, 15th century, Joseon Korea

Unlike Goryeo ware, which are glazed with the rich vibrant color of celadon and often featured characteristics of nature, Joseon white porcelains (baekja) are characterized by the beauty of modest forms, and minimal use of color, which conveyed the ideals of Korean Confucian state, that was preeminent at the time. The inimitably unique beauty of Korean culture came to be mirrored in baekja and gradually diversification in color and design became shared by both the court and the common people.

Color was not entirely devoid in Joseon white ware. As early as the 15th century, baekja was painted with cobalt blue was highly prized, more so than white ware because of its rarity and difficulty to make. From the 17th century onward, iron brown became popular and was used to decorate baekja, especially when the cost of cobalt rose too high. Iron-brown is often used to paint in unique styles, and some of the best examples reflect carefree and humorous, such as dragons circling the rotund jars. Even more uncharacteristic for baekja, and especially difficult is painting them with copper-red decorations. The pieces with the copper-red that have been successfully produced originated from the 18th century.

== Production ==
Baekja is shaped from well-refined white clay (kaolin or petuntse), glazed with feldspar, and then fired. Although the name is derived from its basic color, minute color differences often appear according to the properties of the clay and the glaze, as well as the firing method and temperature: some porcelains are pure white, while others may have slight tints of light blue or light yellow. White porcelain wares are made at more than 1300 degrees Celsius inside a kiln while the blue green celadon was made under 1200 degrees Celsius. When comparing Joseon white porcelain to Goryeo, the wares prove to be both stronger and more durable another reason they were favored during the Joseon dynasty.

== Uses ==
Baekja was manufactured throughout the Joseon dynasty and was widely used by people in their daily lives. During the 15th and 16th centuries, dishes, bowls, bottles, and jars of simple yet elegant forms and shapes were preferred. Departing from everyday practical use, baekja also had ceremonial uses, such as burial vessels. Historically baekja had been used as placenta jars, usually made in sets of two, one inside the other, for holding and burying the placenta of a prince or princess. In the 18th century, large bulbous vessels known as moon jars became fashionable.

== Gallery ==
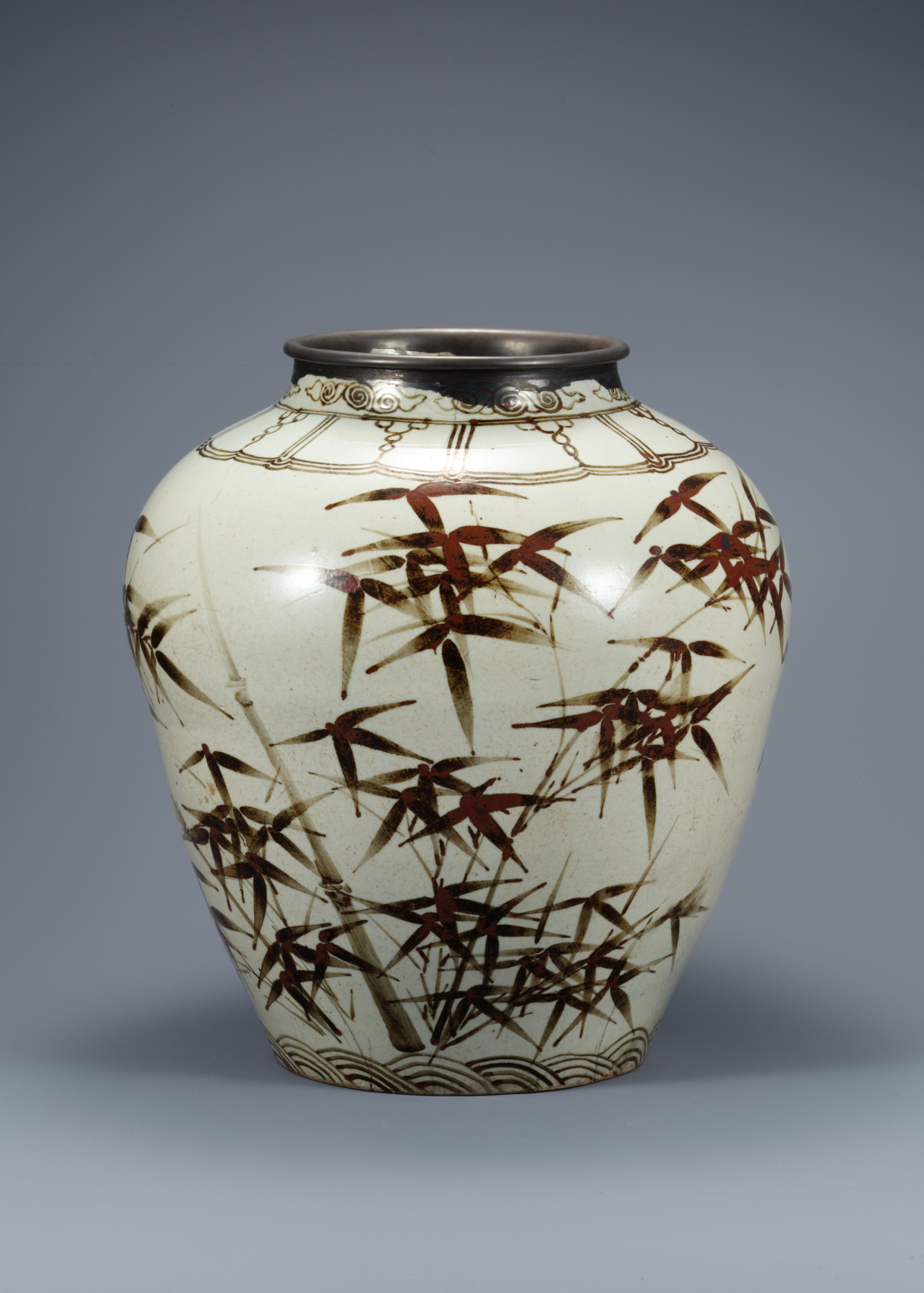
Jar with red bambus decoration (National Treasure No. 166)

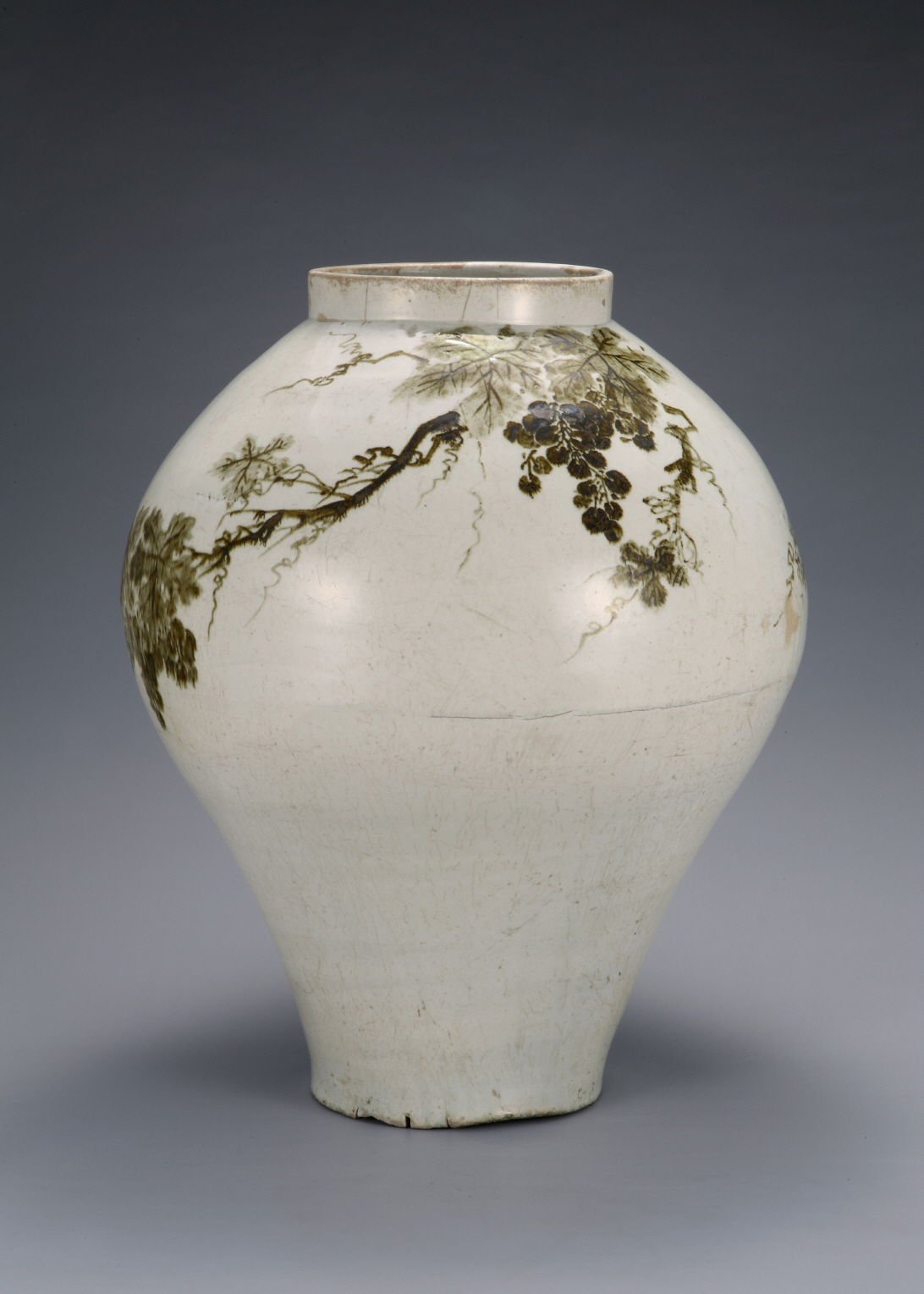
Jar with green colour plant decoration, Joseon dynasty (National Treasure No. 107)

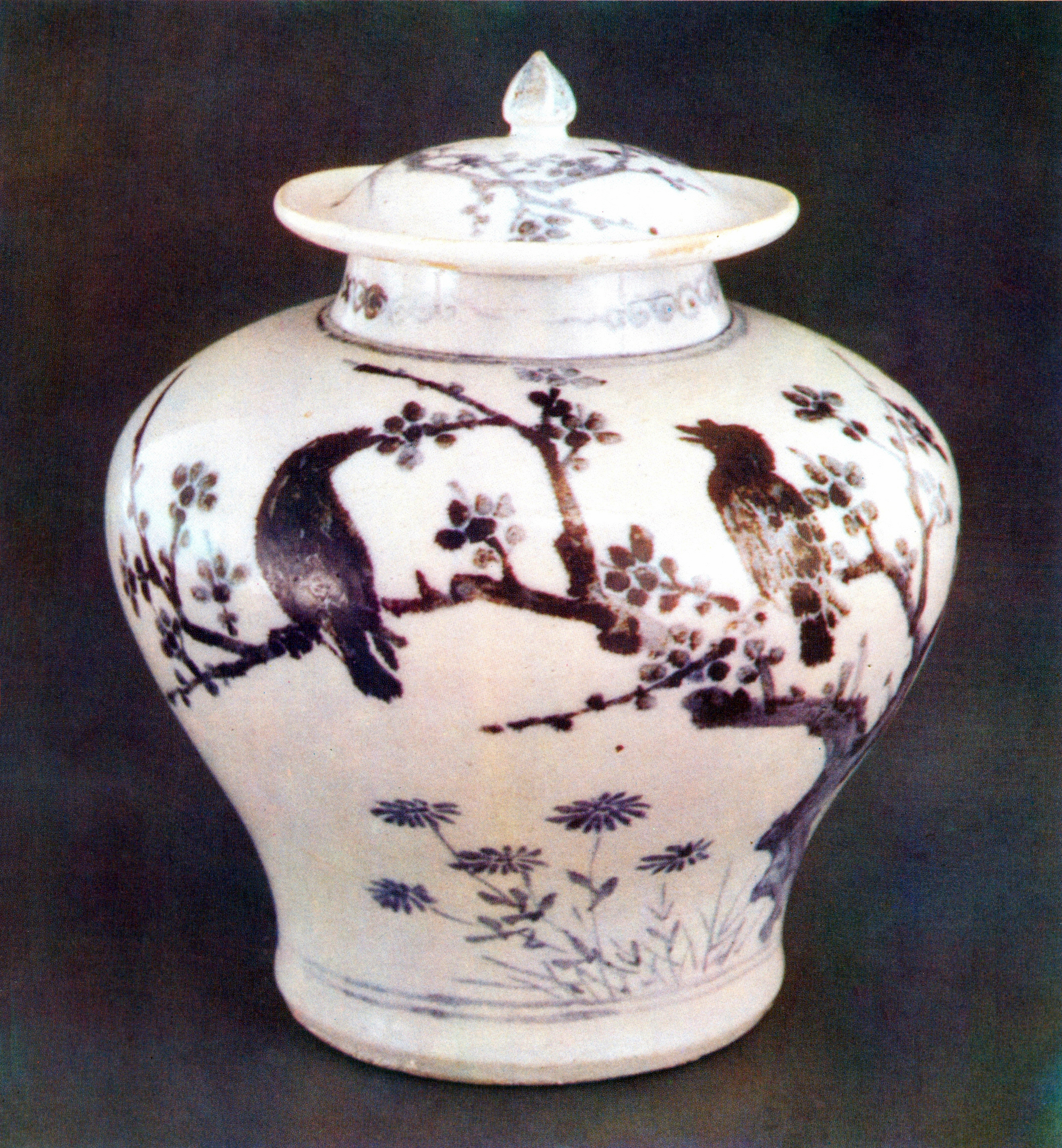
Pot with blue painted pattern of plum blossom, birds and bamboo (National Treasure No. 170)

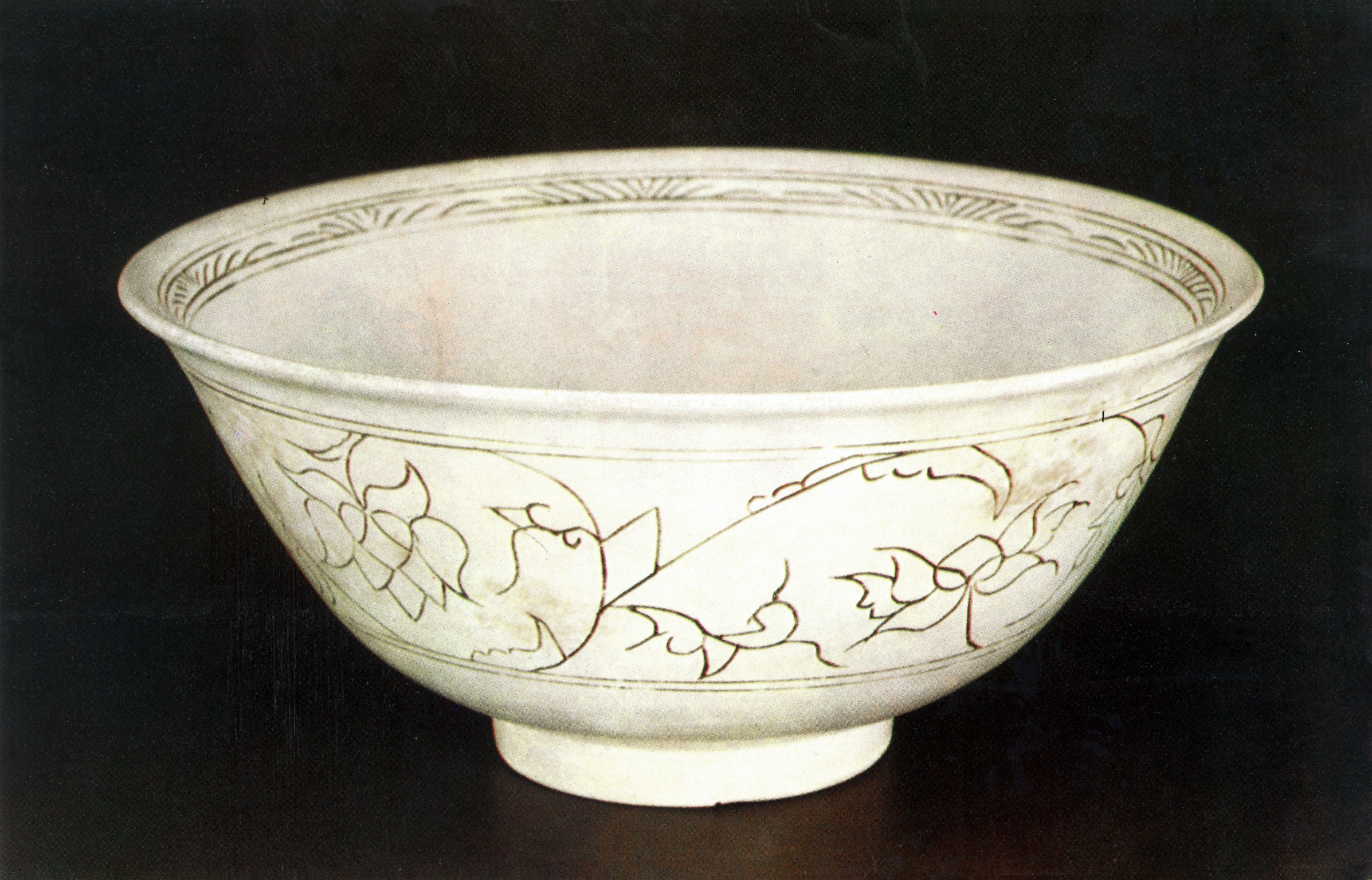
Bowl with inlaid lotus and arabesque design (National Treasure No. 175)

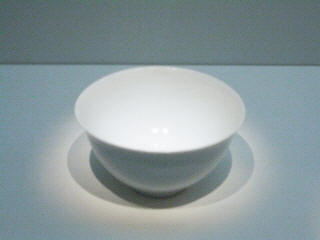
Korean white porcelain bowl produced during the Joseon dynasty, 15th century AD

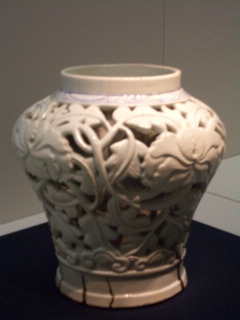
Porcelain jar, 18th century, Joseon Korea

== See also ==
- Blue and white porcelain
- Korean pottery and porcelain
- Dehua porcelain
