= Korean pottery and porcelain =

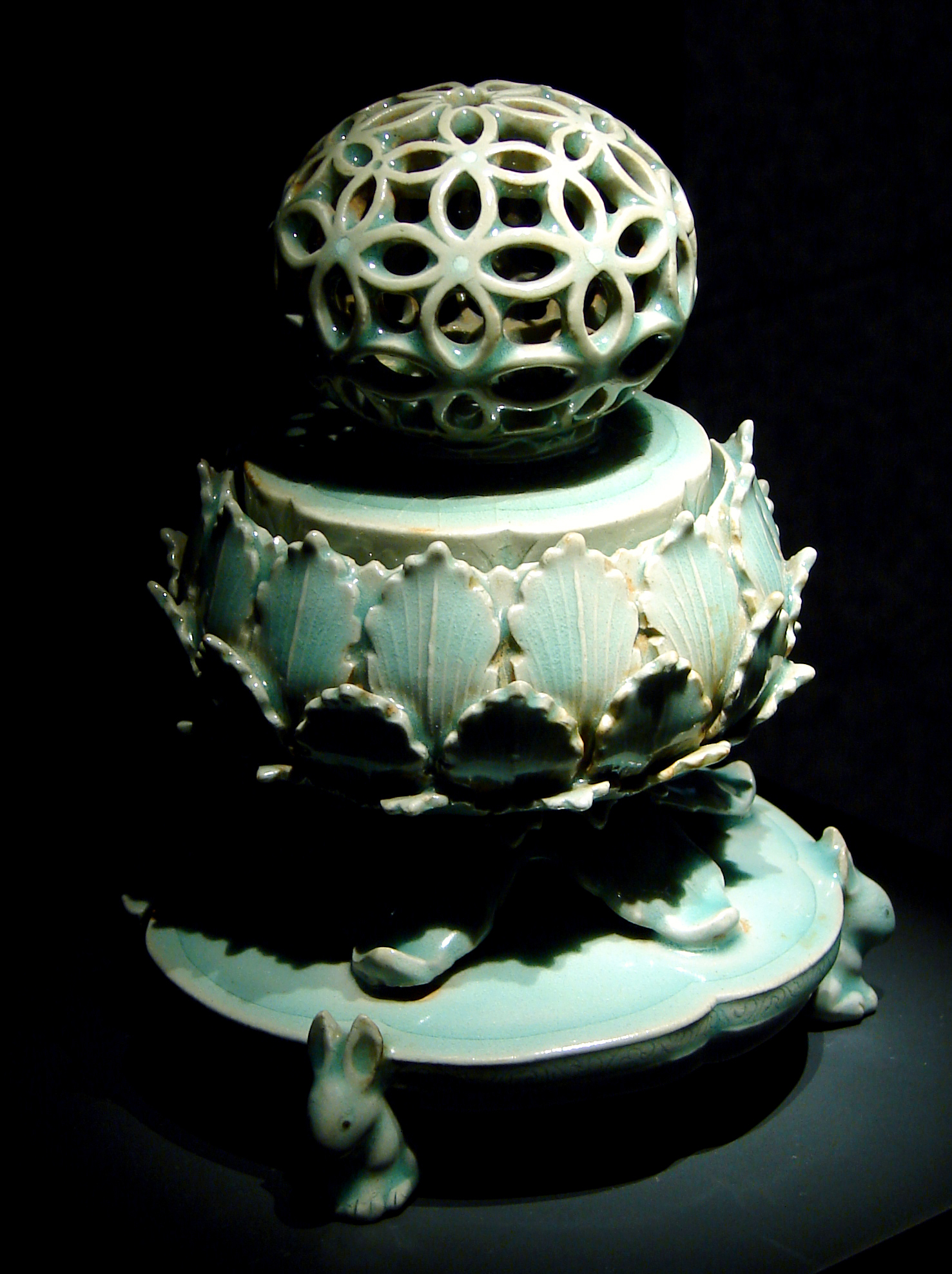
A celadon incense burner in Goryeo ware with kingfisher glaze. National Treasure No. 95 of South Korea.

Korean ceramic history (도자기; dojagi) begins with the oldest earthenware from around 8000 BC. Throughout the history, the Korean peninsula has been home to lively, innovative, and sophisticated art making. Long periods of stability have allowed for the establishment of spiritual traditions, and artisan technologies specific to the region. Korean ceramics in Neolithic period have a unique geometric patterns of sunshine, or it is decorated with twists. In Southern part of Korea, Mumun pottery were popular. Mumun togi used specific minerals to make colors of red and black. Korean pottery developed a distinct style of its own, with its own shapes, such as the moon jar or Buncheong sagi which is a new form between earthenware and porcelain, white clay inlay celadon of Goryeo, and later styles like minimalism that represents Korean Joseon philosophers' idea. Many talented Korean potters were captured and brought to Japan during the invasions of Korea, where they heavily contributed to advancing Japanese pottery. Arita ware, founded by Yi Sam-pyeong opened a new era of porcelain in Japan. Another Japanese representative porcelain, Satsuma ware was also founded by Dang-gil Shim and Pyeong-ui Park. 14th generation of Su-kwan Shim have been using the same name to his grandfather and father to honor they are originally Korean, 14th Su-kwan Shim is honorable citizen of Namwon, Korea.

== History ==
=== Jeulmun pottery period (Neolithic) ===
The earliest known Korean pottery dates back to around 8000 BC, and evidence of Mesolithic Pit–Comb Ware culture (or Yunggimun pottery) is found throughout the peninsula, such as in Jeju Island. Jeulmun pottery, or "comb-pattern pottery", is found after 7000 BC, and is concentrated at sites in west-central regions of the Korean Peninsula, where a number of prehistoric settlements, such as Amsa-dong, existed. Jeulmun pottery bears basic design and form similarities to that of Eurasian lands. The earliest pottery of this design is found in Korea.

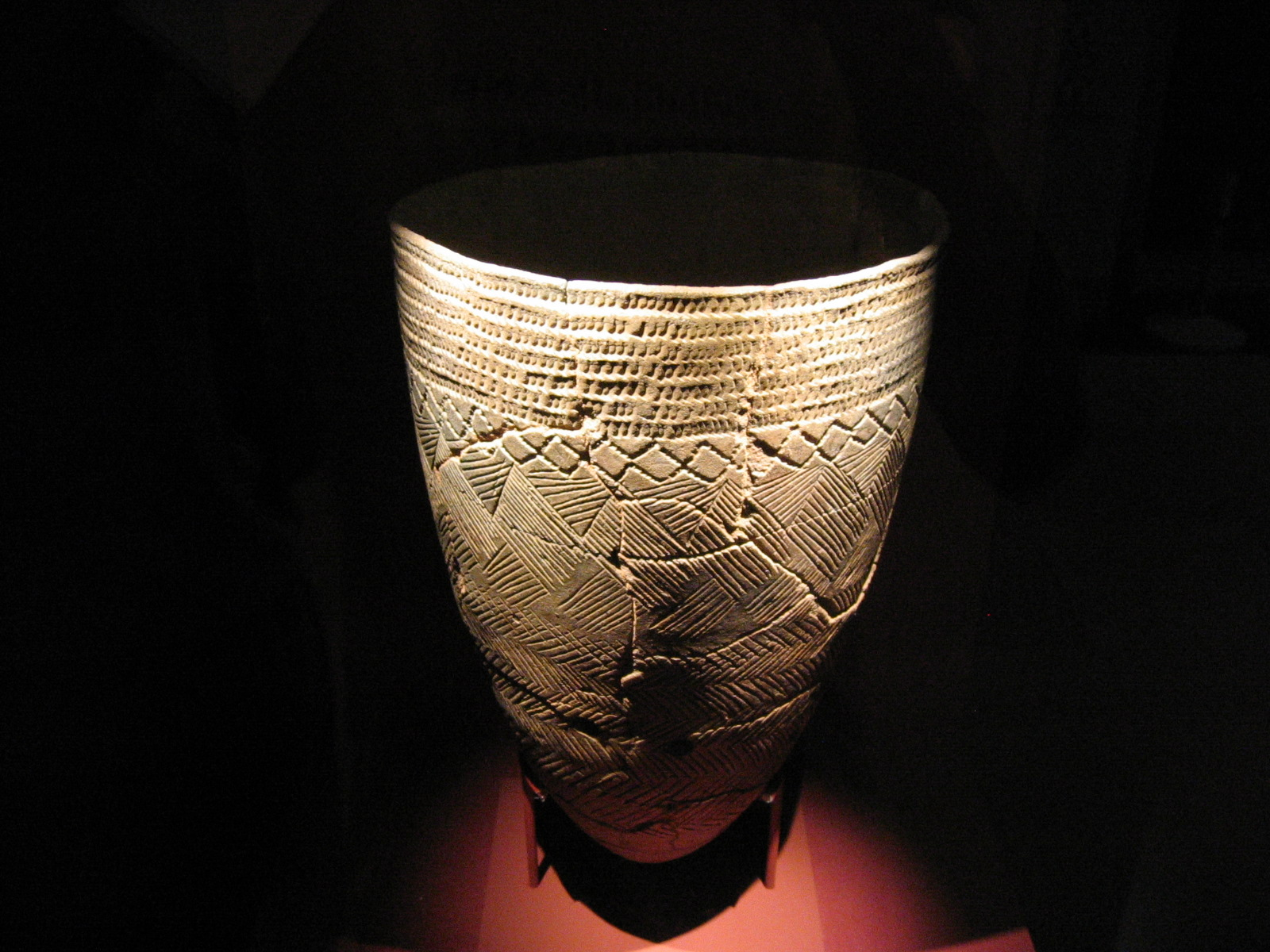

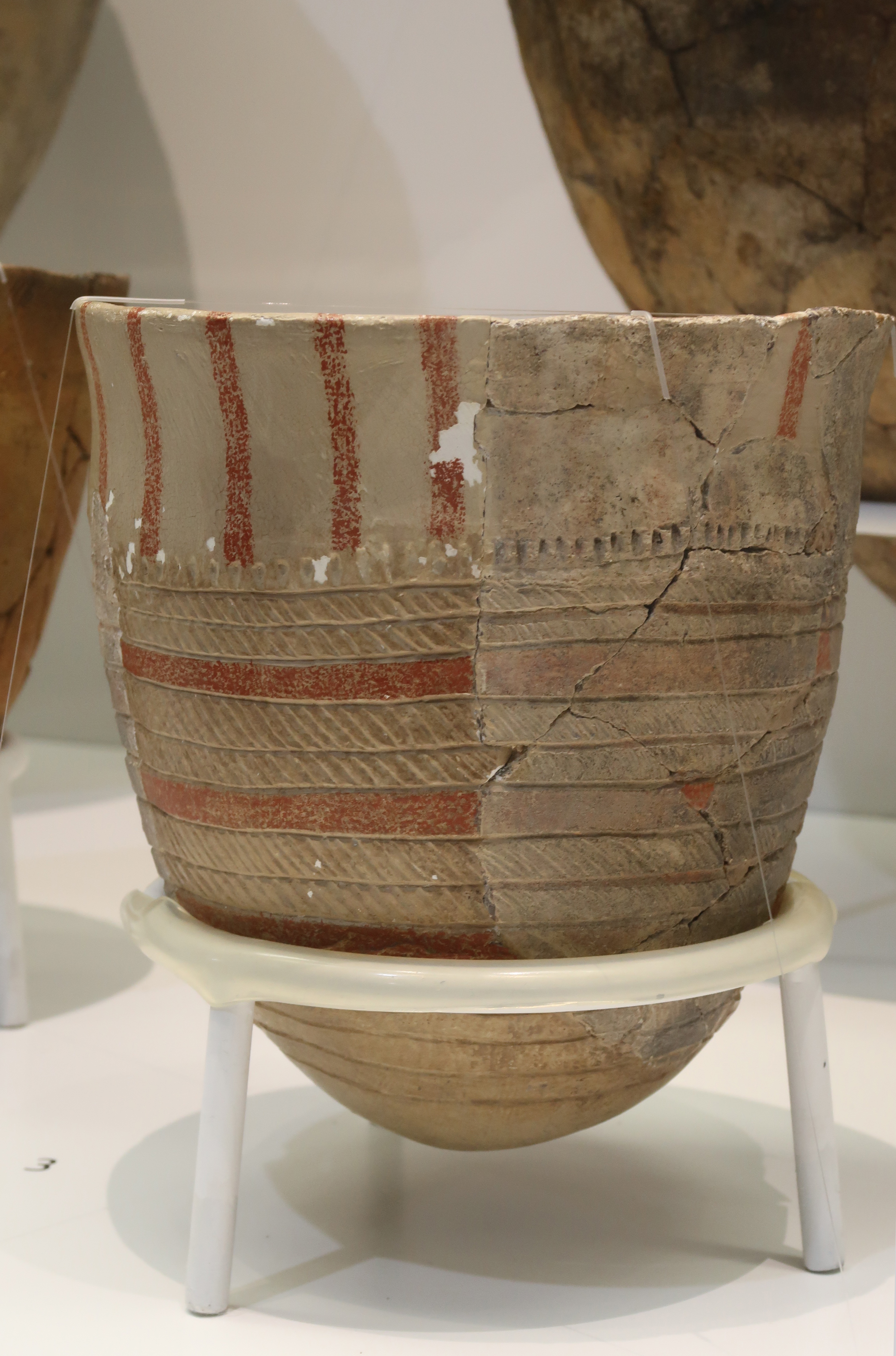

=== Mumun pottery period (Bronze Age) ===
The Mumun age starts around 3000 BC and lasts to 400 BC. Mumun pottery are often found in dolmens with Korean harp, bipa shaped bronze dagger and bronze tools around. Potteries of this period have flat bottoms and smooth surface, it has got the name Minmuneui, Mumun pottery. Ancient Joseon and Buyeo used them for ritualistic purposes as well as practical usage. As rice cultivation widely spread, practical jars with handles on both sides were developed, which is called Misongri Togi.

=== Samhan period ===
Different gray colors and shapes of potteries baked at around 900 degree Celsius appears during Samhan period. These potteries were initially called Gimhae pottery named after the discovered site, Gimhae. Many of them were inside shell midden near river.

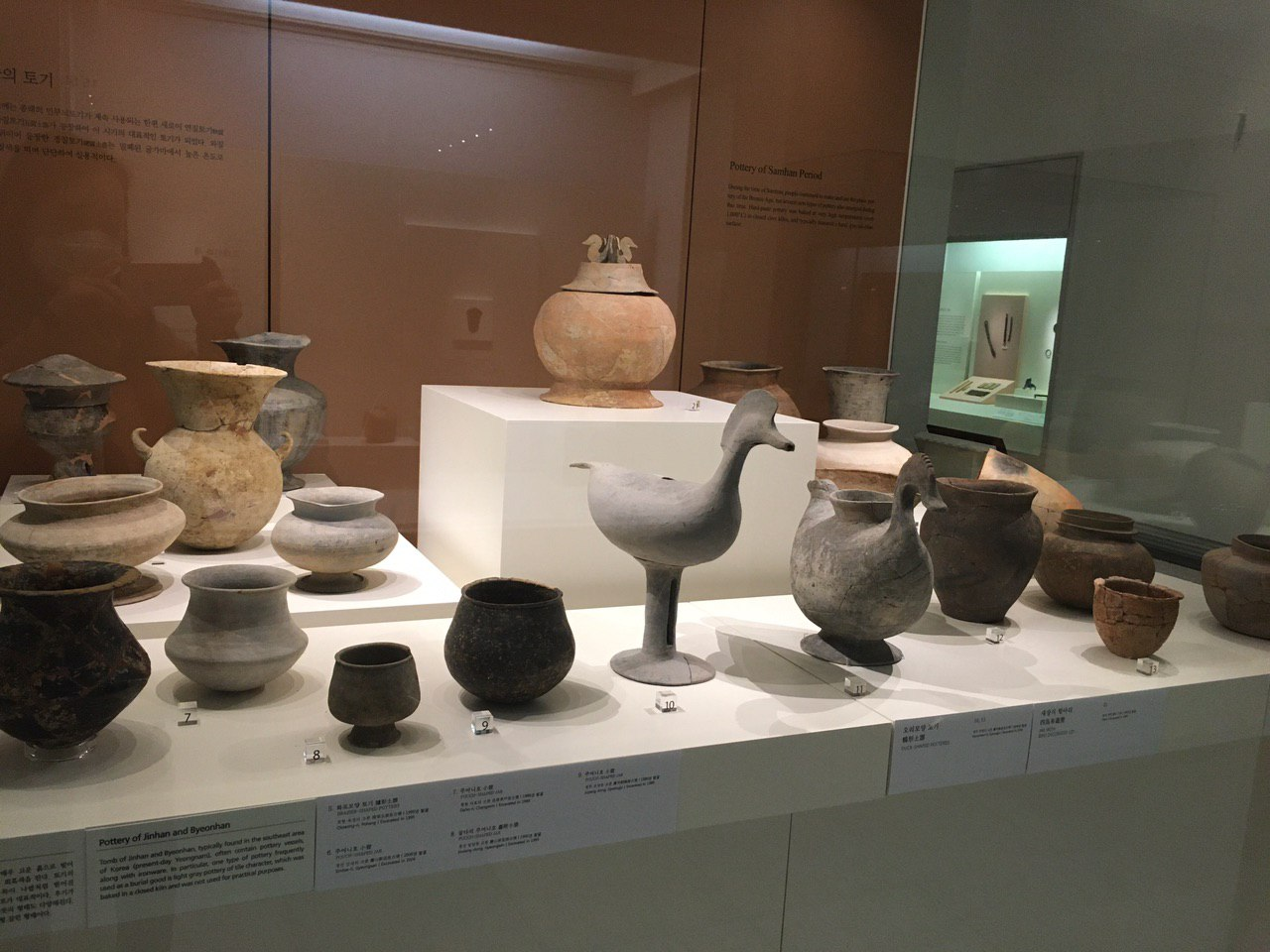
Samhan period's potteries and togi objects

=== Three Kingdoms period ===
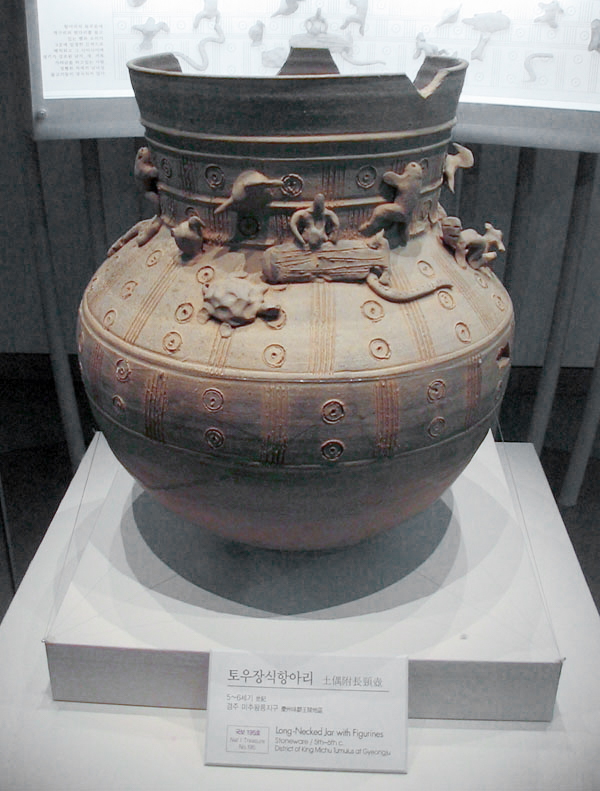
Long-necked jar with figurines, Silla of Three Kingdom period

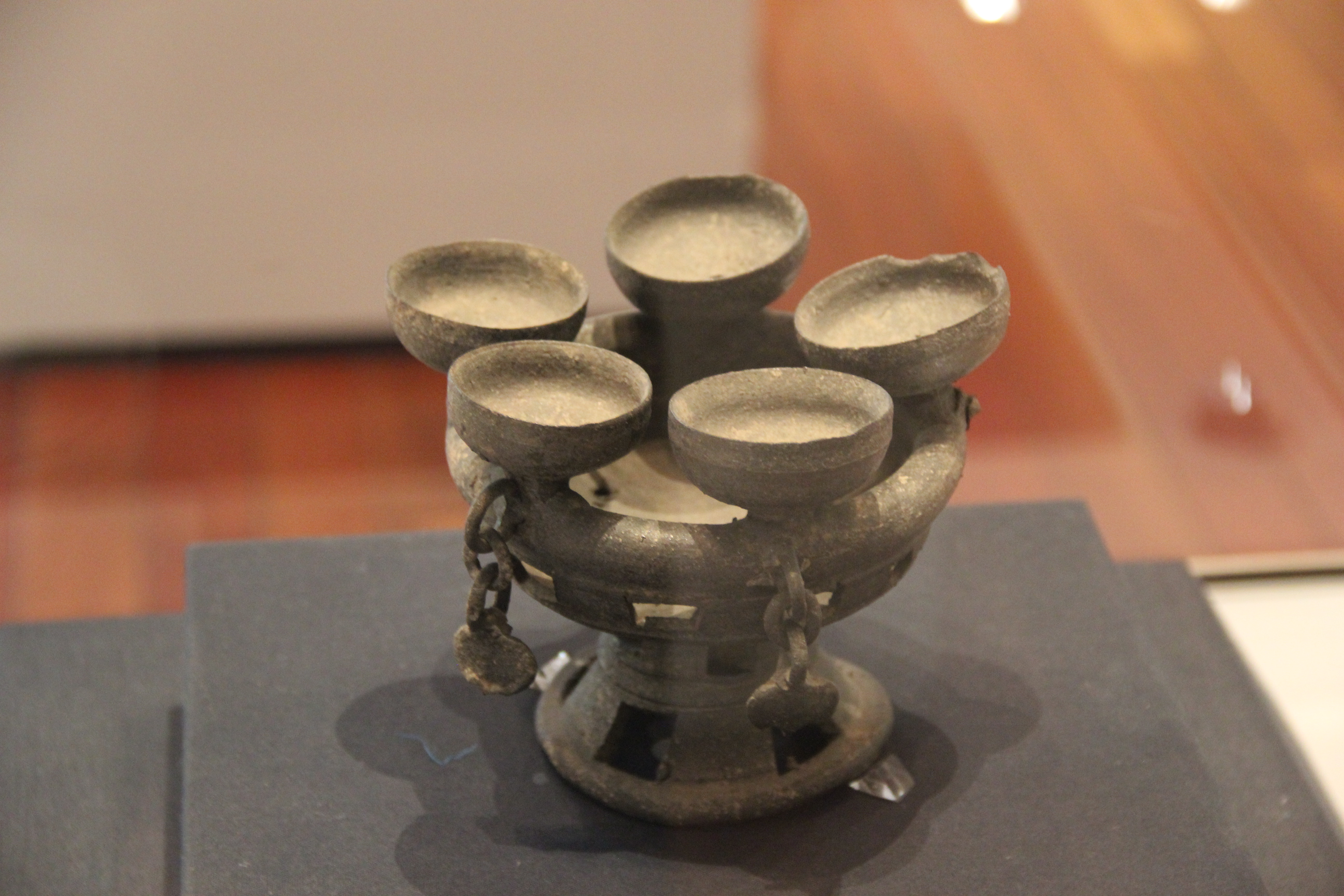
Early Silla kingdom period's ceramics for tea ceremony

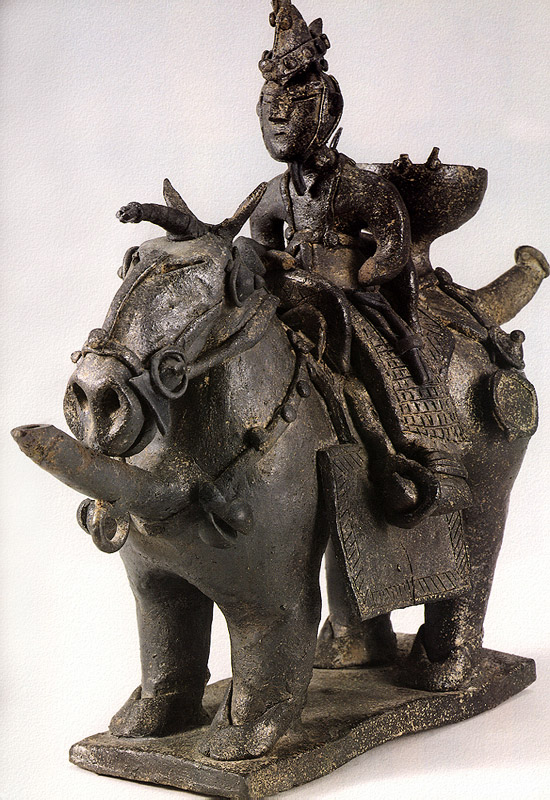
Toyong, Earthenware of a person on horseback, Silla of Three Kingdom period

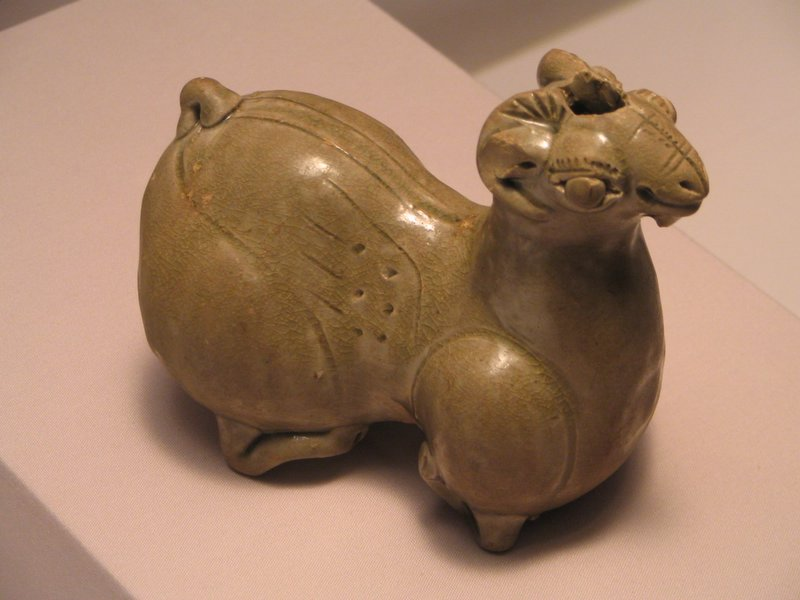
Sheep-shaped celadon from the 3rd to 4th century Baekje kingdom

=== Later Silla ===
Pottery of the Later Silla period (668–935) or Silla period had a unique goopdari stand stool designs like Gaya kingdom. In comparison to Gaya, they had more objects put on potteries, three dimensional. There are antlers, horns, horse motifs in stonewares, and they have left interesting objects like Roman soldier, Arabian, anteater and elephants. Because those animals do not live in Korea, it can be assumed they travelled very far.

Celadon subsequently became the main production.

Temples increased the demand for celadon-glazed wares (cheongja), causing cheongja celadon to evolve very quickly, with more organic shapes and decorations, such as animal and bird motifs. But the celadon do not have any relationships with Buddhism itself, there are jade gokok in the old Stone Age, Korea and jade necklaces in the Neolithic age. The jade was valued as a treasure like we can witness many jade gokoks are hanging in Shilla's golden crown. Those jade gokok were symbol of creativity of the universe.

When making cheongja wares, a small amount of iron powder was added to the refined clay, which was then coated with a glaze and an additional small amount of iron powder, and then finally fired. This allowed the glaze to be more durable, with a shinier and glossier finish than white wares.

=== Goryeo ===
White clay inlay technique called 'sangam' was developed in Goryeo period. adorned with drawings of cranes and clouds. "Cheongja unhak sanggam mun maebyeong", 12th-century.

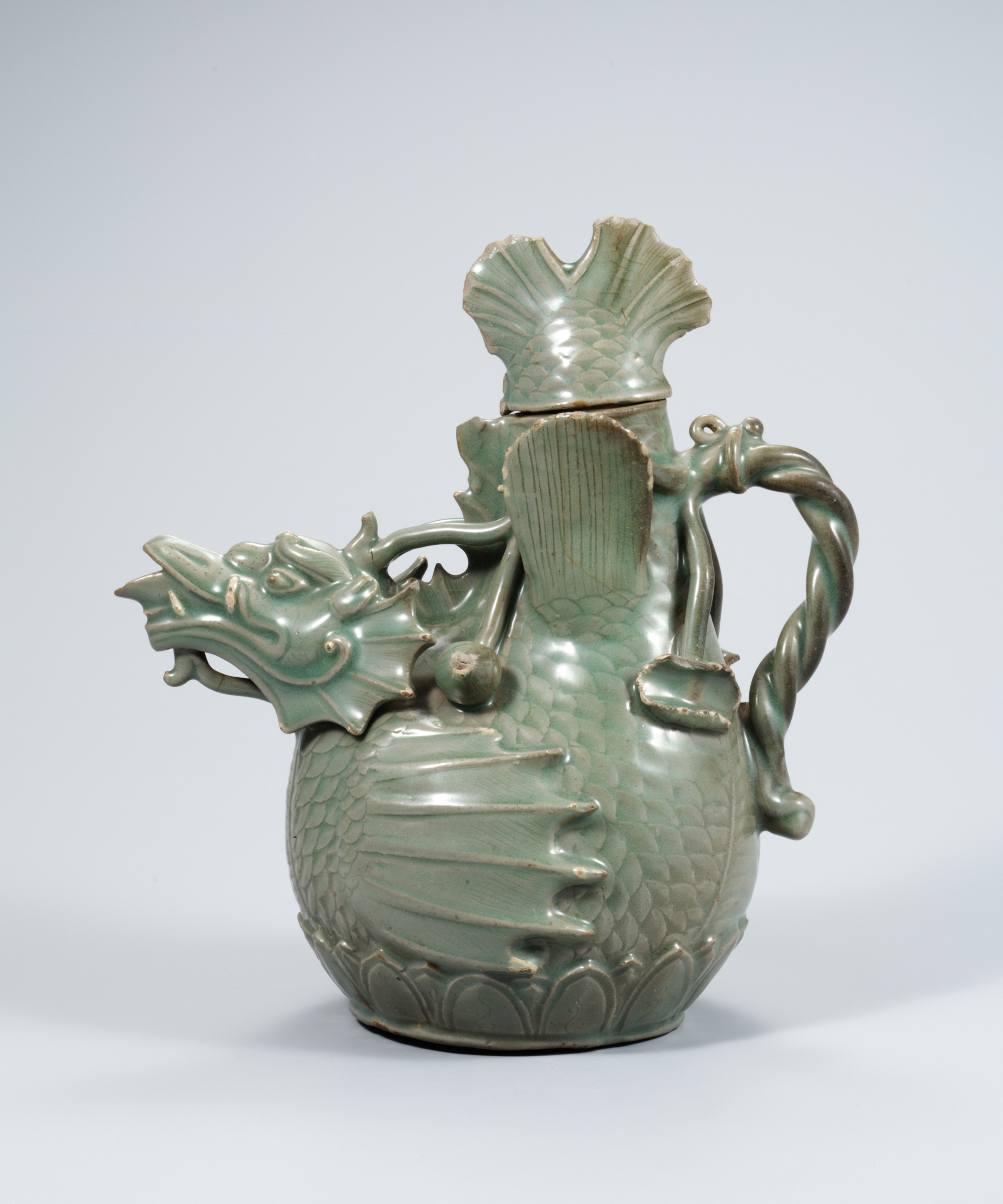
Dragon-shaped pitcher made in the Goryeo Dynasty. National Treasure No. 61 of South Korea

The Goryeo dynasty (918–1392) achieved the unification of the Later Three Kingdoms under Wang Geon. The works of this period are generally considered to be the finest works of ceramics in Korean history. Korean celadon reached its pinnacle with the invention of the sanggam inlay technique in the early 12th century.

Key-fret, foliate designs, geometric or scrolling flowerhead bands, elliptical panels, stylized fish, insects, birds and the use of incised designs began at this time. Glazes were usually various shades of celadon, with browned glazes to almost black glazes being used for stoneware and storage. Celadon glazes could be rendered almost transparent to show black and white inlays. Jinsa "underglaze red", a technique using copper oxide pigment to create copper-red designs, was developed in Korea during the 12th century, and later inspired the "underglaze red" ceramics of the Yuan dynasty.

While the forms generally seen are broad-shouldered jars, larger low jars or shallow smaller jars, highly decorated celadon cosmetic boxes, and small slip-inlaid cups, the Buddhist potteries also produced melon-shaped vases, chrysanthemum cups often of spectacularly architectural design on stands with lotus motifs and lotus flower heads. In-curving rimmed alms bowls have also been discovered similar to Korean metalware. Wine cups often had a tall foot which rested on dish-shaped stands.

Baekja wares came from highly refined white clay, glazed with feldspar, and fired in regulated and clean large kilns. Despite the refining process, white glazes invariably vary as a result of the properties of the clay itself; firing methods were not uniform, temperatures varied and glazes on pieces vary from pure white, in an almost snowy thickness, through milky white that shows the clay beneath deliberately in washed glaze, to light blue and light yellow patinas. After having succeeded the tradition of Goryeo baekja, soft white porcelain was produced in the Joseon dynasty, but from the mid-Joseon on hard white porcelain became the mainstream porcelain.

The baekja wares reached their zenith immediately before the Joseon dynasty came to power. Fine pieces have recently been found in the area around Wolchil Peak near Mount Kumgang. The transitional wares of white became expressions of the Joseon dynasty celebrations of victory in many pieces decorated with Korean calligraphy. Traditionally, white wares were used by the scholarly Confucian class, the nobility and royalty on more formal occasions.

=== Joseon ===
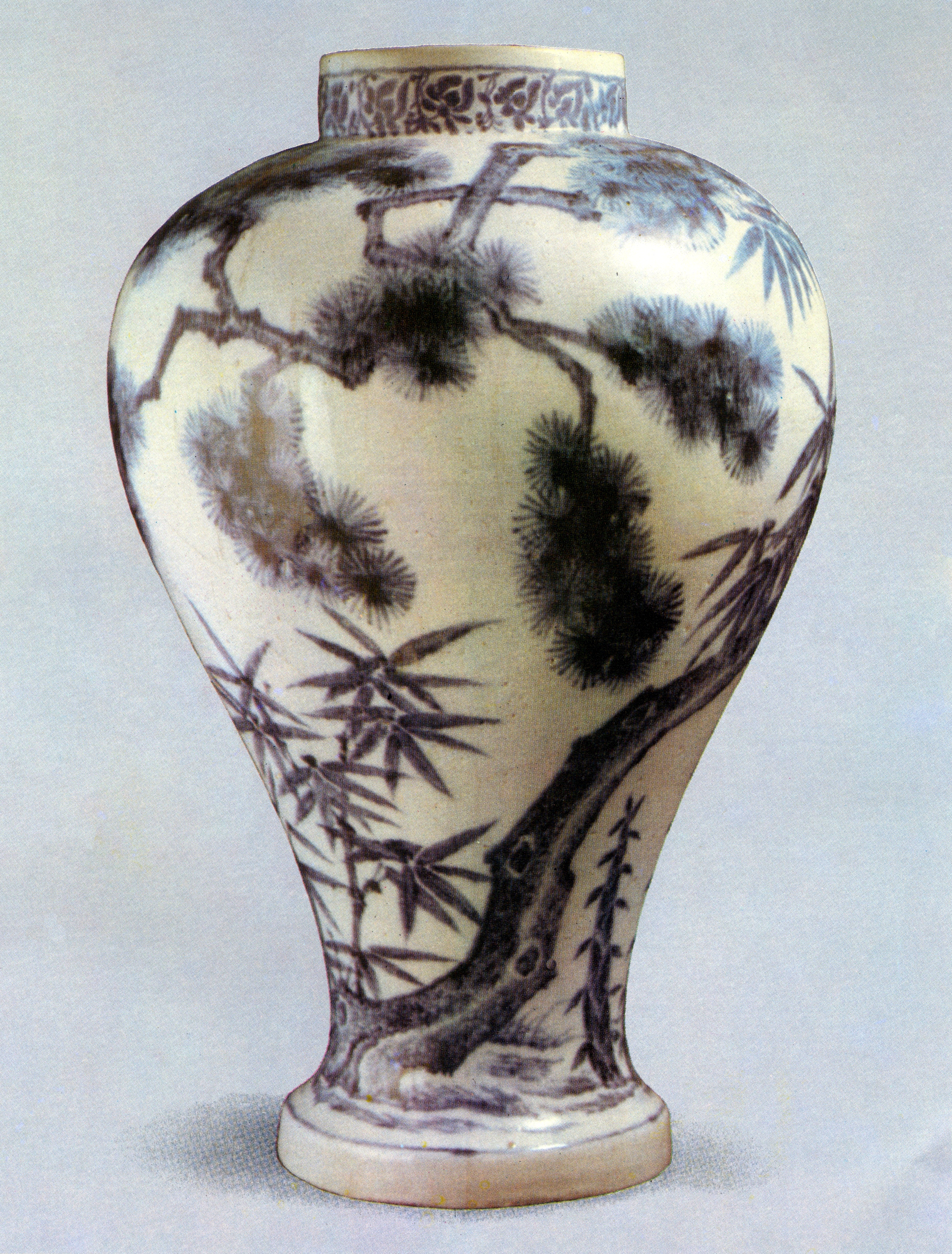
Blue and white porcelain jar with pine and bamboo designs was made in 1489, Joseon dynasty, Korea. Dongguk University Museum, Seoul.

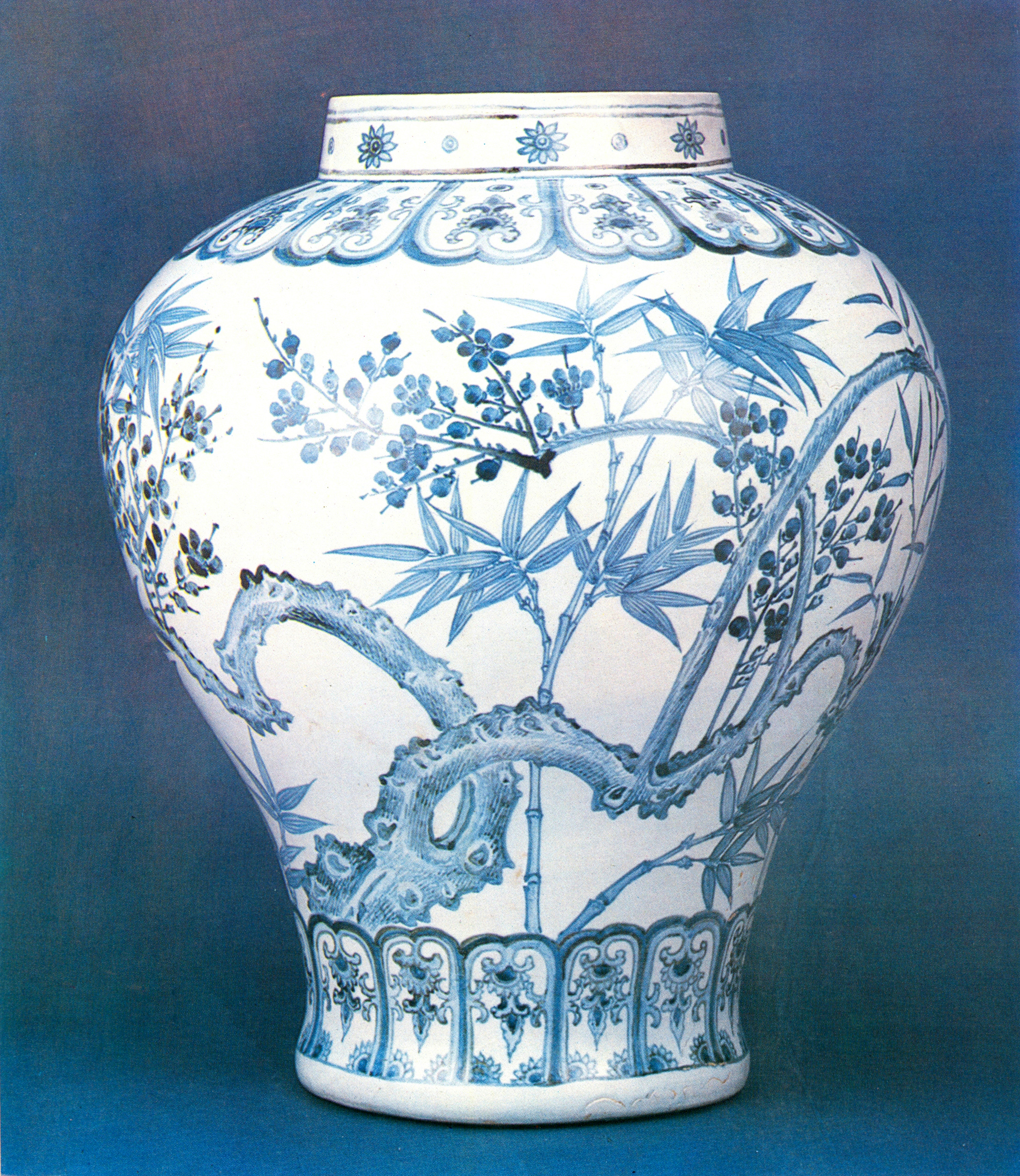
15th century. Joseon dynasty, Korea. Blue and white porcelain jar with plum and bamboo design.

During the Joseon period (1392–1897), ceramic wares were considered to represent the highest quality of achievement from royal, city, and provincial kilns, the last of which were export-driven wares. Joseon enjoyed a long period of growth in royal and provincial kilns, and much work of the highest quality still preserved.

Wares evolved along Chinese lines in terms of colour, shape, and technique. Celadon, white porcelain, and storage pottery were similar, but with certain variations in glazes, incision designs, florality, and weight. The Ming influence in blue and white wares using cobalt-blue glazes existed, but without the pthalo blue range, and the three-dimensional glassine colour depth of Ming Dynasty Chinese works.

Simplified designs emerged early on. Buddhist designs still prevailed in celadon wares: lotus flowers, and willow trees. The form most often seen was that of pear-shaped bottles. Notable were thinner glazes, and colourless glazes for buncheong or stoneware. During the Joseon period, Koreans applied the sanggam tradition to create buncheong ceramics. In contrast to the refined elegance of Goryeo celadon, buncheong is painted stoneware designed to be natural, unassuming, and practical. However, the buncheong tradition was gradually replaced by Joseon white porcelain, its aristocratic counterpart, and disappeared in Korea by the end of the 16th century. Buncheong became known and prized in Japan as Mishima.

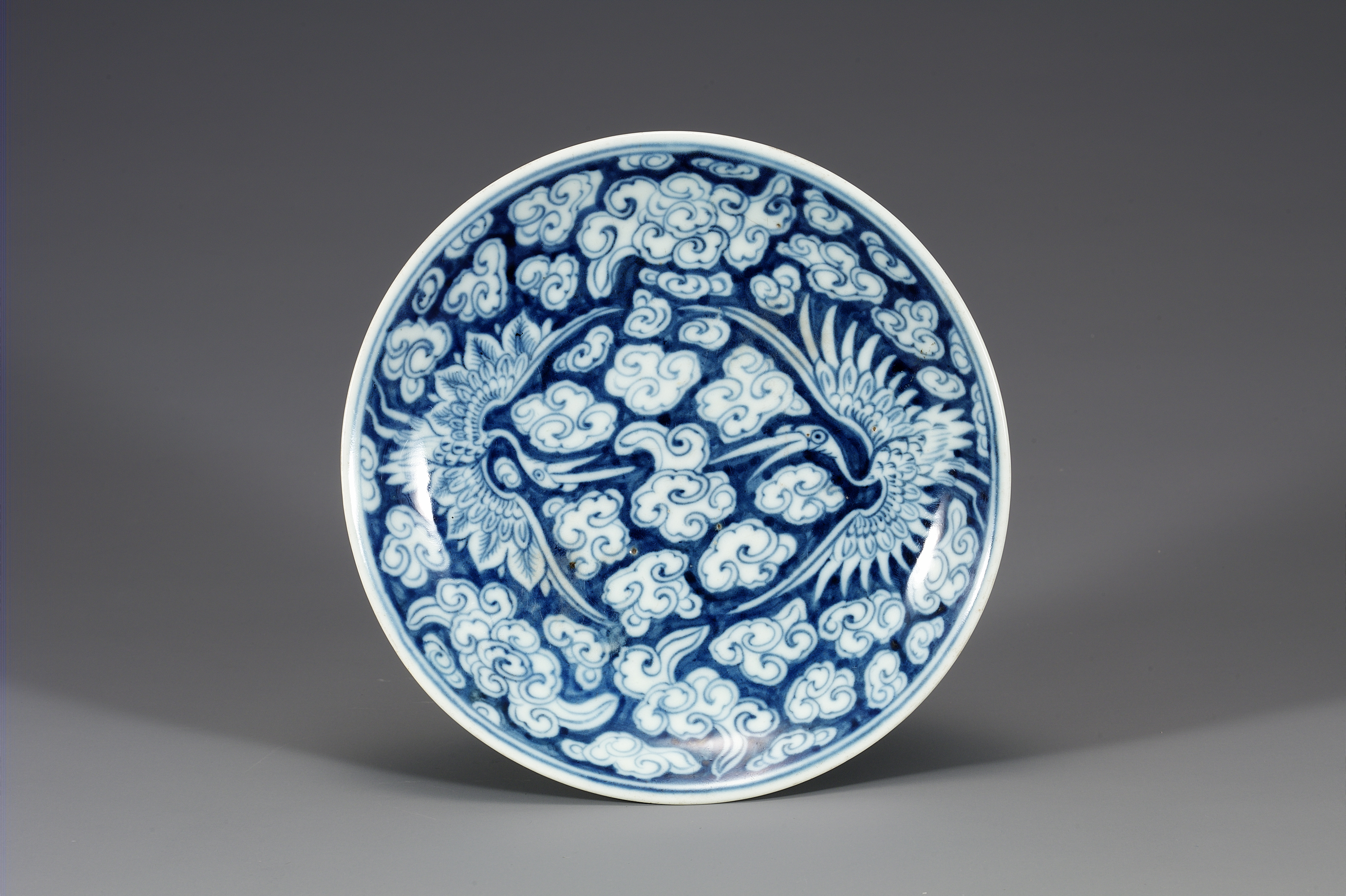
White Porcelain Dish with cloud and crane design in underglaze cobalt blue

Joseon white porcelain representing Joseon ceramics was produced throughout the entire period of the Joseon dynasty. The plain and austere white porcelain suitably reflects the taste of Neo-Confucian scholars. Qing colouring, brighter and almost Scythian in enamel imitation, was rejected by Korean potters, in favour of simpler, less decorated wares in keeping with a new dynasty that built itself on Confucian doctrine.

Generally, the ceramics of this dynasty is divided into early, middle, and late periods, changing every two centuries, approximately; thus 1300 to 1500 is the early period, 1500 to 1700 the middle, and 1700 to 1900–1910 the late period.

The wares began to assume more traditional Korean glazes and more specific designs to meet regional needs. This is to be expected, as the Scythian art influences were of the former dynasty. The rise of white porcelain occurred as a result of Confucian influence and ideals, resulting in purer, less pretentious forms lacking artifice and complexity.

In 1592 during the Japanese invasion of Korea, entire villages of Korean potters were forcibly relocated to Japan, damaging the pottery industry as craftsmen had to relearn techniques because the masters were gone.

=== 20th century ===
A revival of celadon pottery began in the early 20th century, including the work of Living National Treasure, Yu Geun-Hyeong, whose work was documented in the 1979 short film, Koryo Celadon.

More practical potteries were loved during this period, while big companies like Hankook Porcelain and Haengnam Porcelain were established. Buncheong casual wares also revived and became widely popular due to the modern-day eco-minimal trend.

== Types ==
=== Goryeo celadon ===
Goryeo was a golden era for porcelains. Goryeo celadon, Buncheong and even baekje white porcelain appeared during this dynasty.

Even though celadon was first made during Baekje kingdom period 3rd to 4th century, in Goryeo it is applied to various forms and designs.

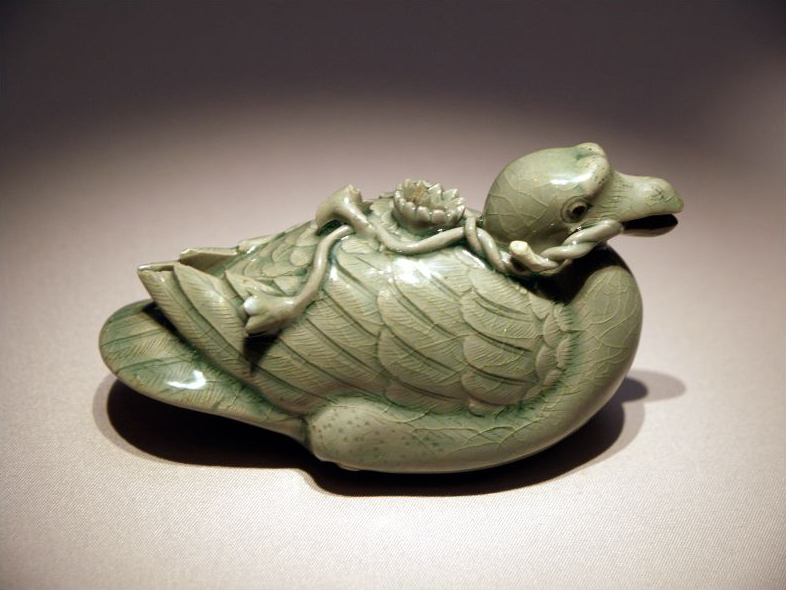
Goryeo celadon exhibited at the National Museum of Korea. This is a water kettle for calligraphy from the 12th century AD.

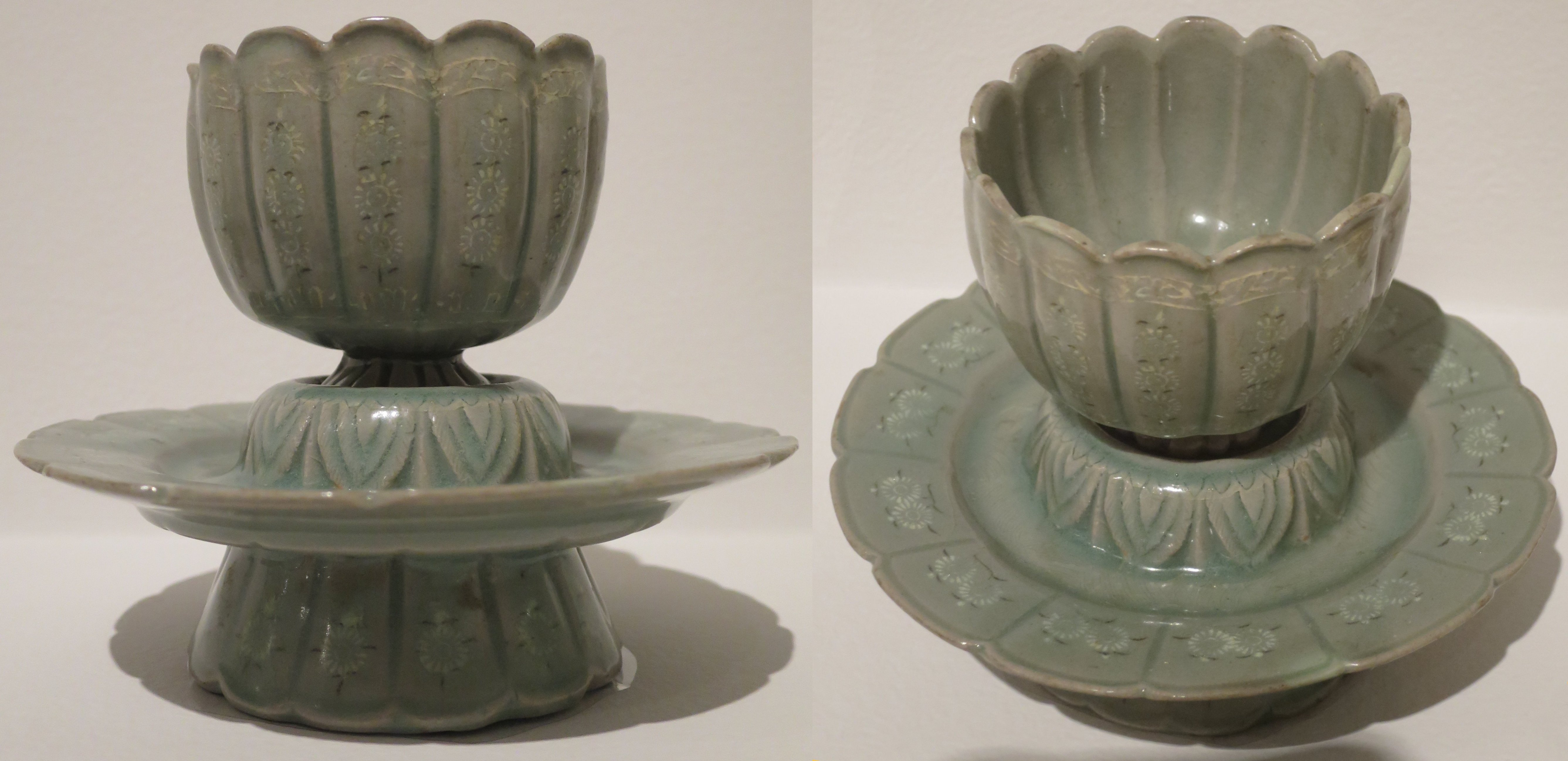
Tea cup for a ceremony, celadon, 12th century of Goryeo sangam inlay technique

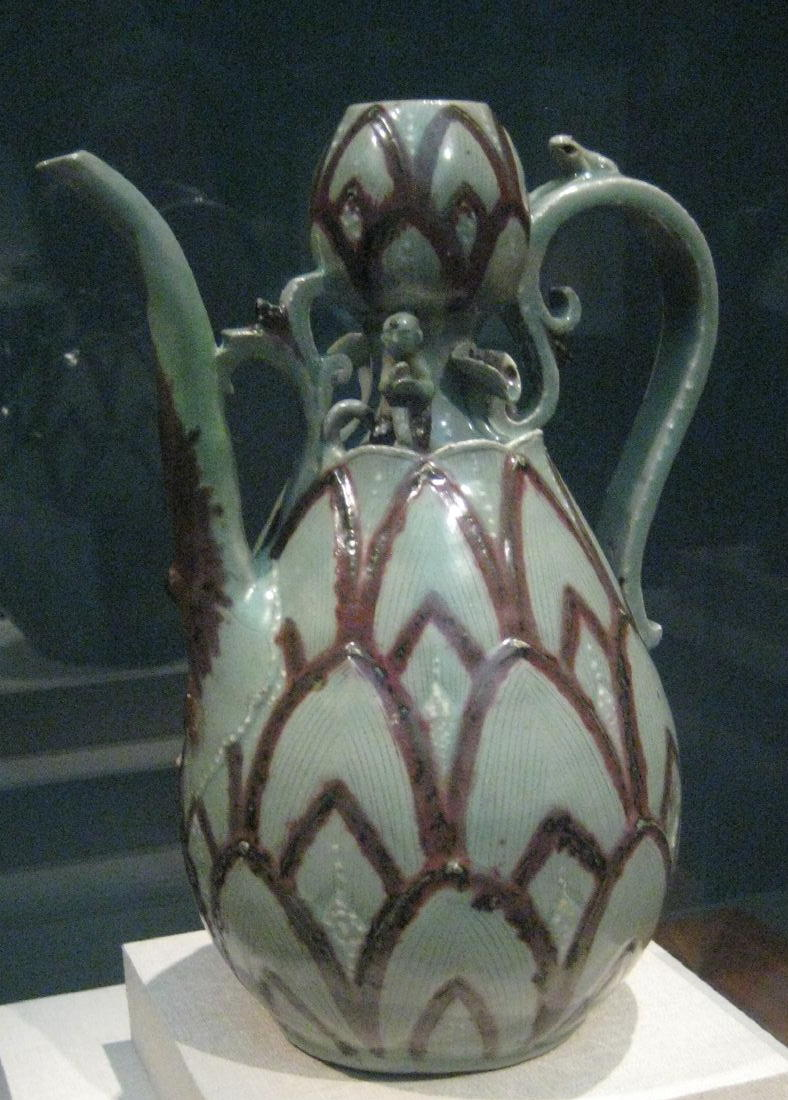
Wine ewer, celadon with iron painting cheolhwa technique, Goryeo Dynasty, c. 1250 AD

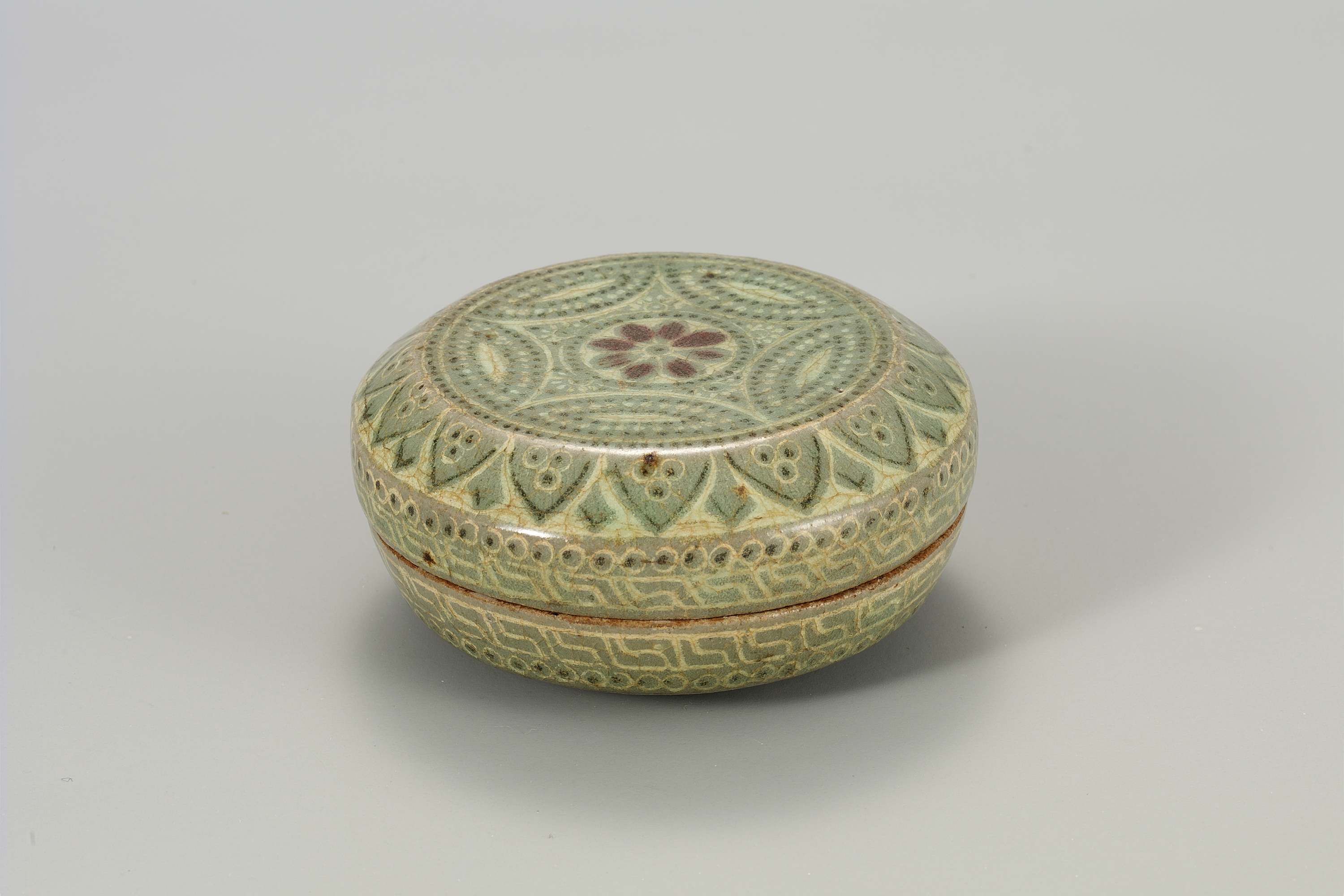
Koryeo's incense keeping box called hyanghap

=== Buncheong ===
Buncheong was first made during 13 century of Goryeo dynasty although it became widely popular in Joseon dynasty period, 15C. The major consumers of celadon were nobles but buncheong was loved by common people.

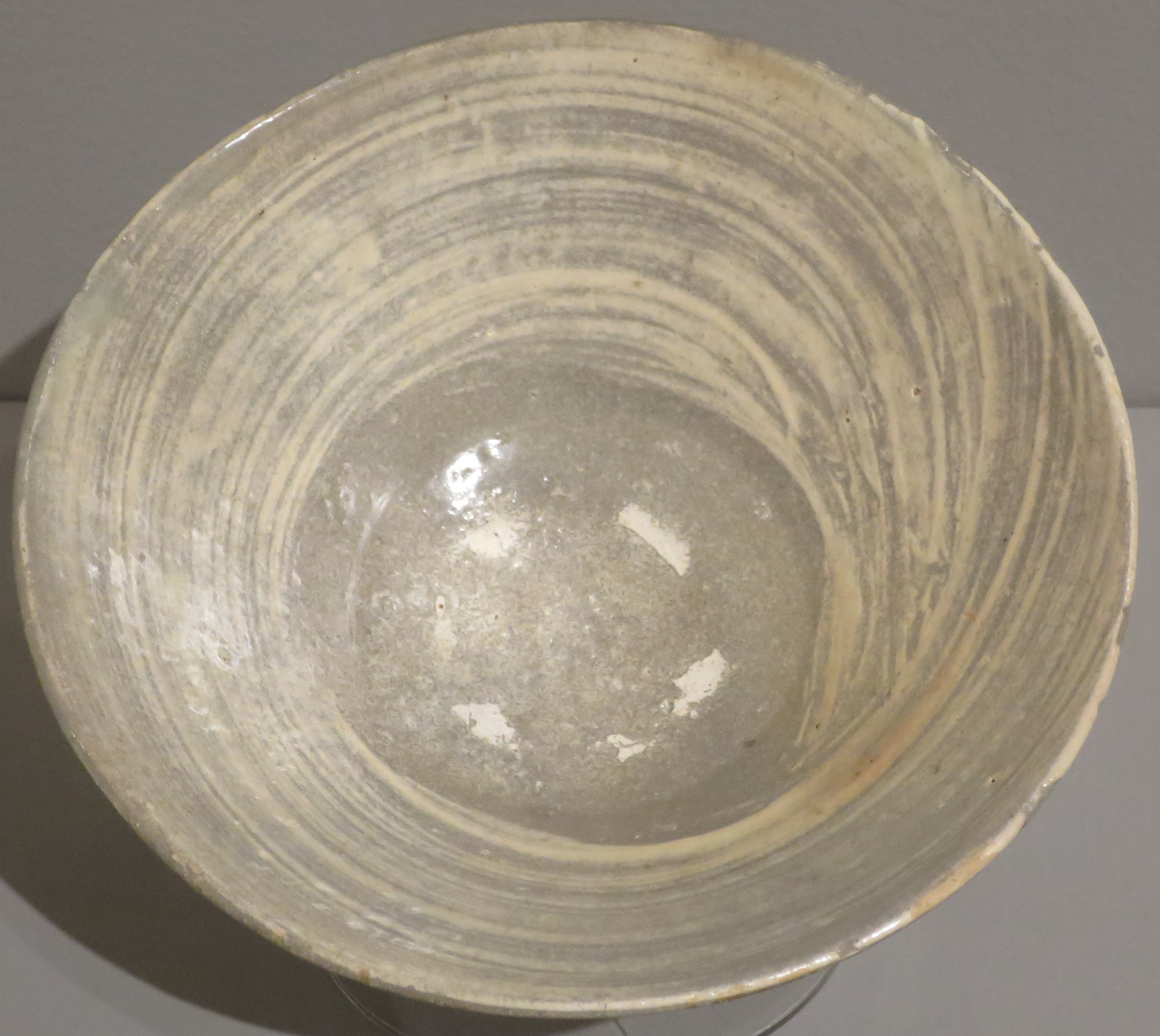
Joseon period's common people enjoyed using Buncheong. Being at a natural state lead to another beauty. Late 15th–early 16th century.

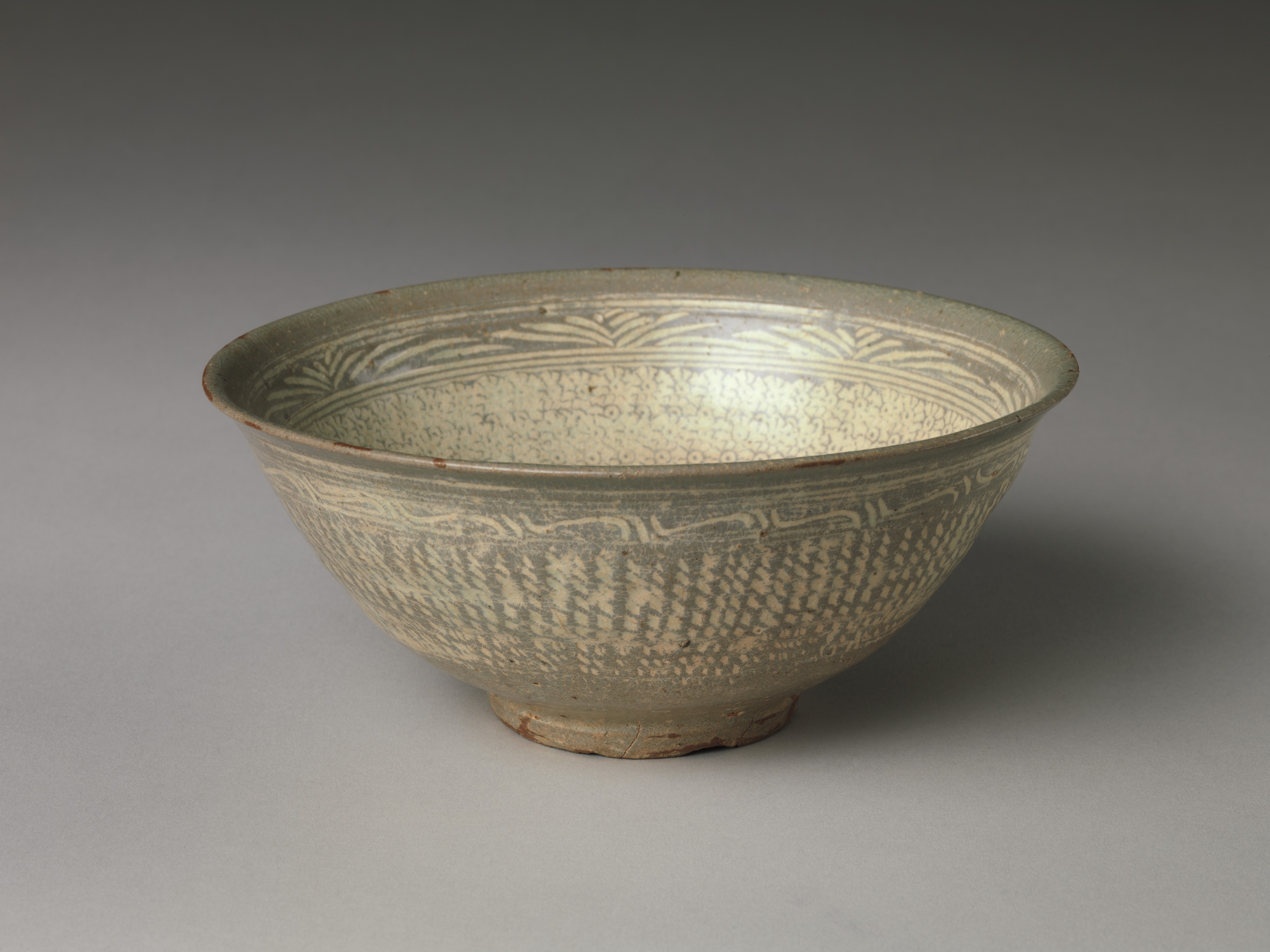
Buncheong bowl with tortoiseshell and chrysanthemum decorations

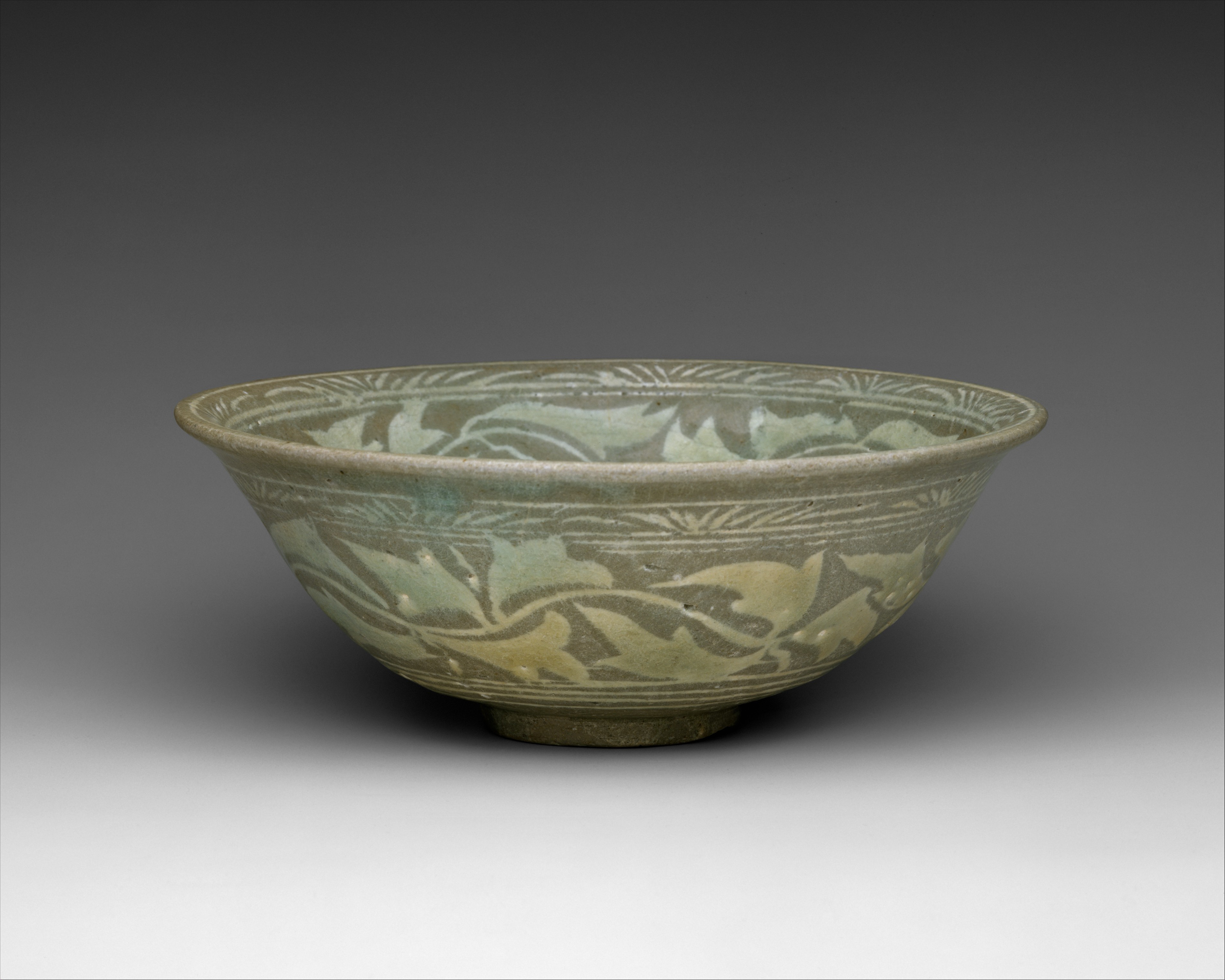
Buncheong bowl inwha combined with bakji technique, decorated with peony leaves and chrysanthemum

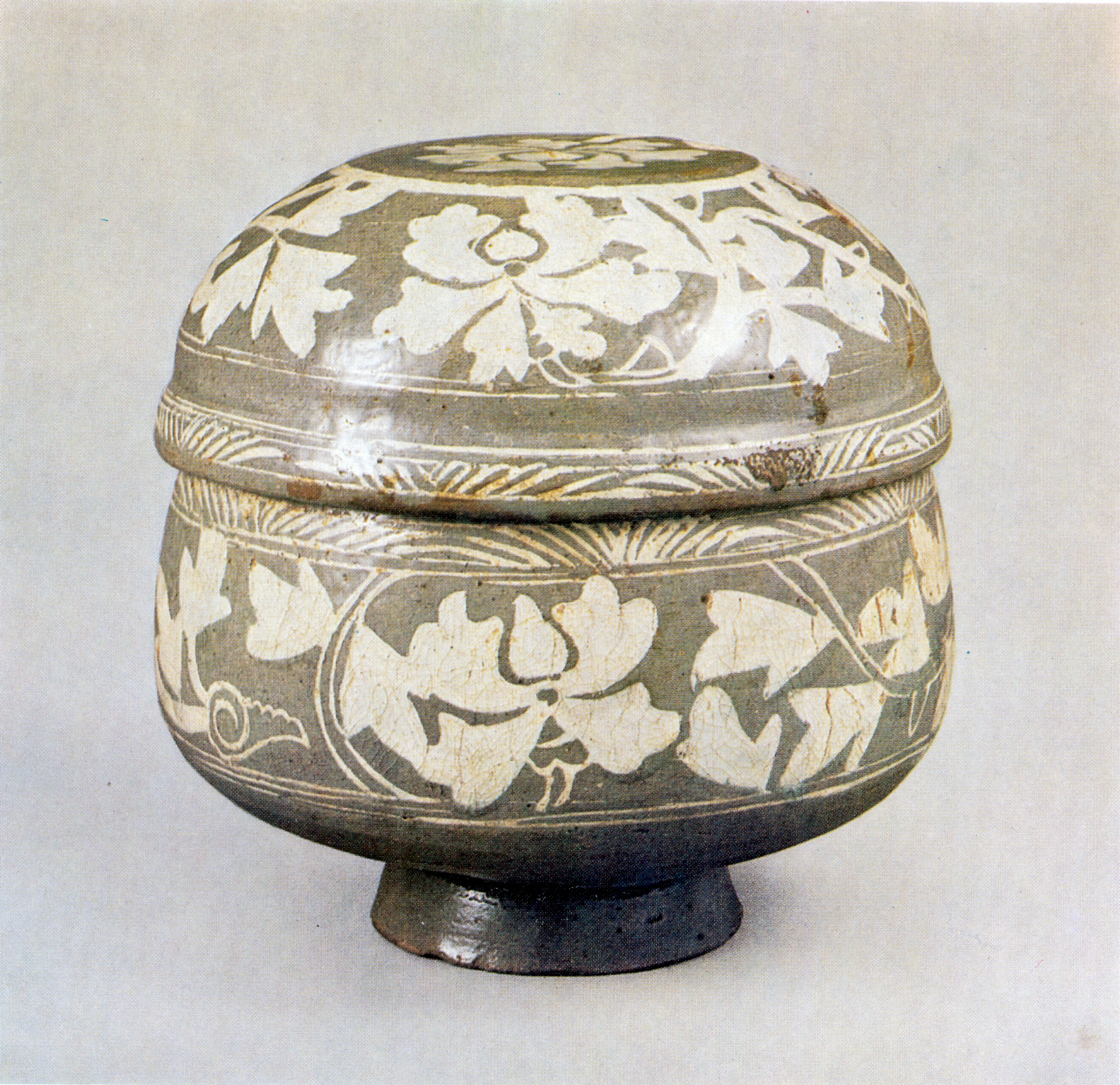
Tea cup buncheong eumgak with inlaid peony

=== Baekja, white porcelain ===
The characteristics of Korean white porcelain are simplicity, warmth and elegance. The warmth comes from the color and the shape, Korean Baekja. White porcelain typically has ivory colors with some other shades. The Joseon dynasty was Seonbi philosophers' or scholars' country.

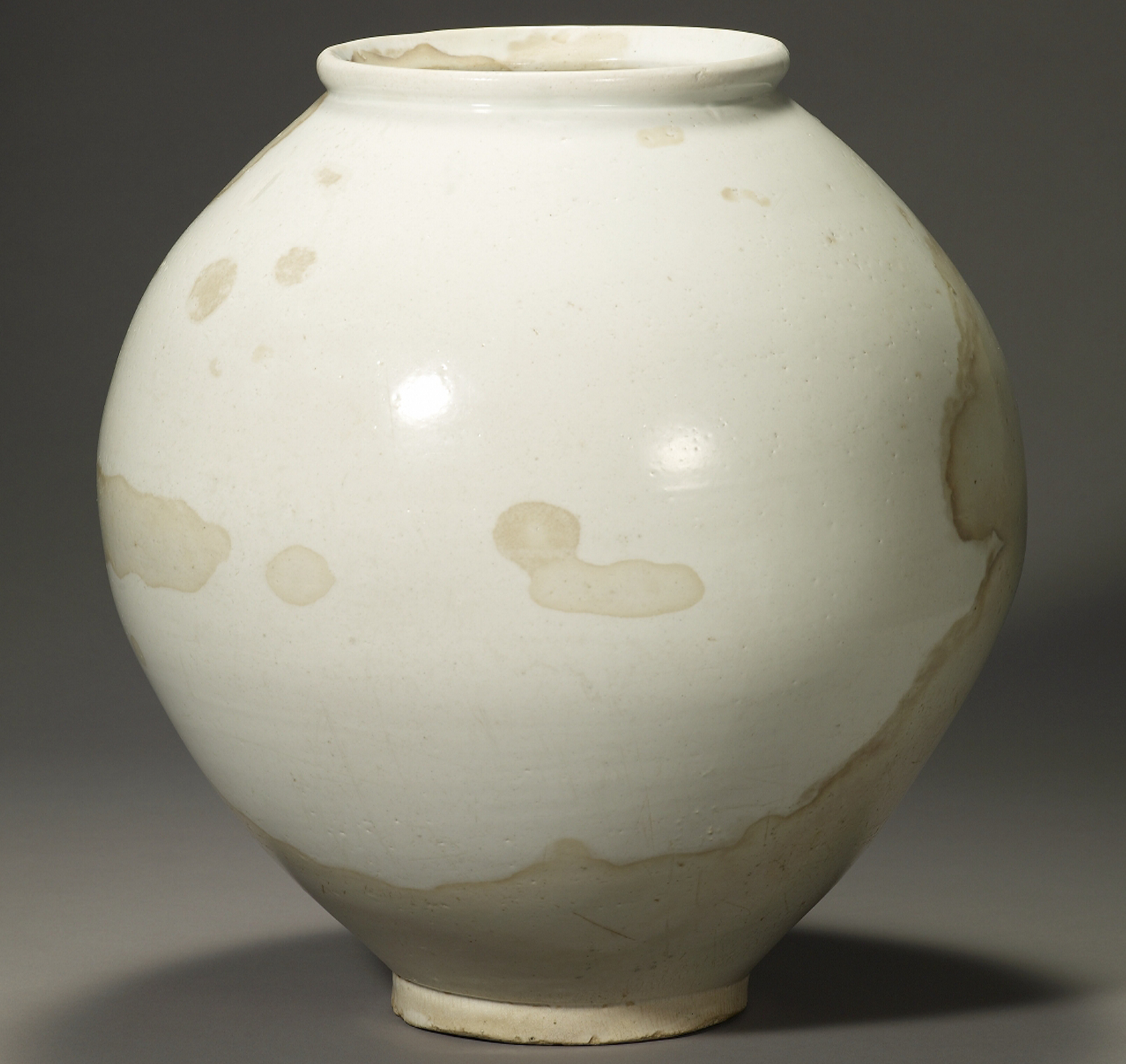
Baekja Dal hangari, Moon jar of Joseon

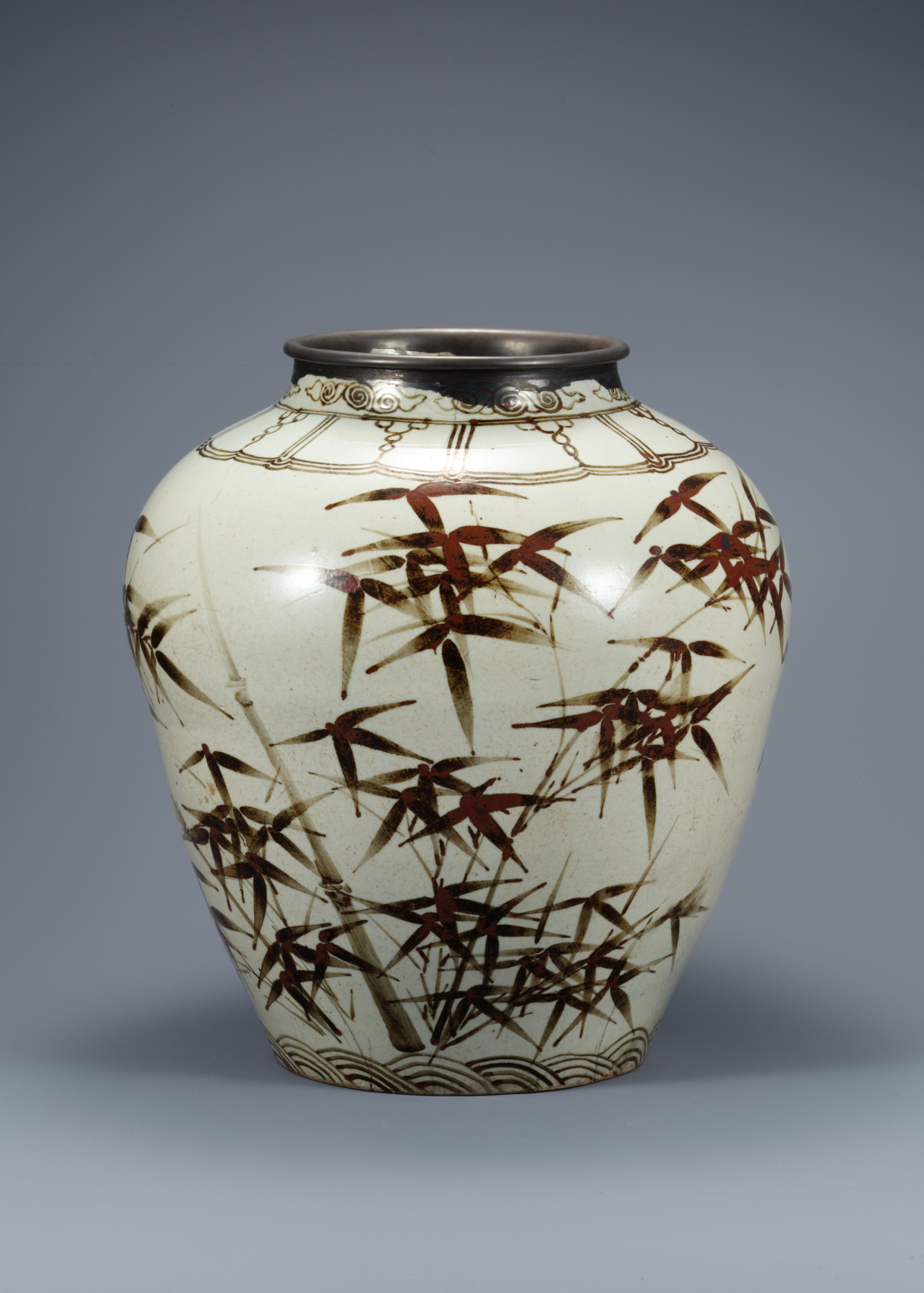
Cheolhwa porcelain, vase with bamboos meaning integrity, Joseon dynasty, 16th century AD

Maehwa flower and bamboo derive from the motif of Maenangookjook, which compares four plants to Confucian scholars, 1600s

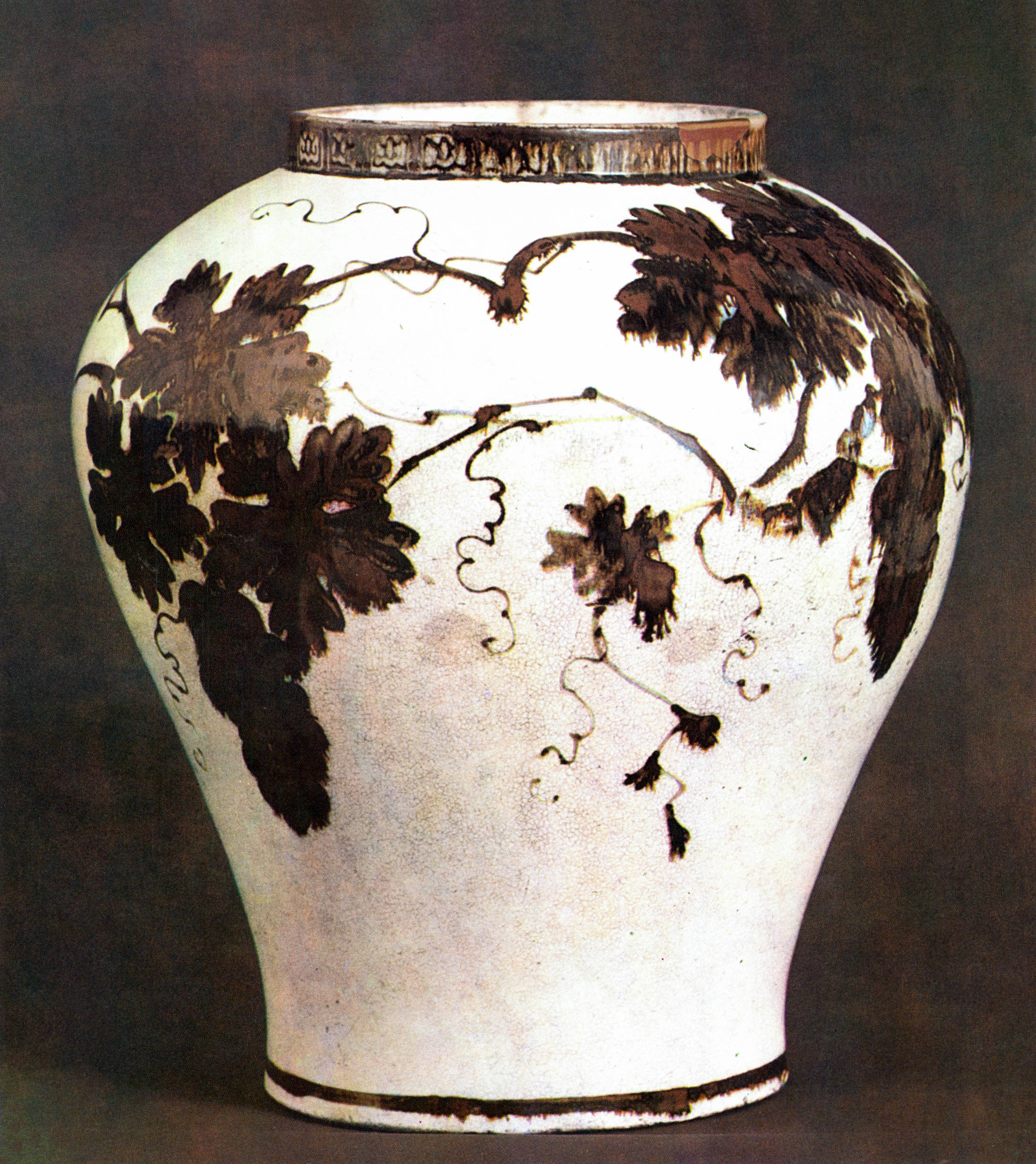
Joseon porcelain pot to draw pattern of grapes and monkey with Iron oxide, Joseon dynasty, early 18th century AD

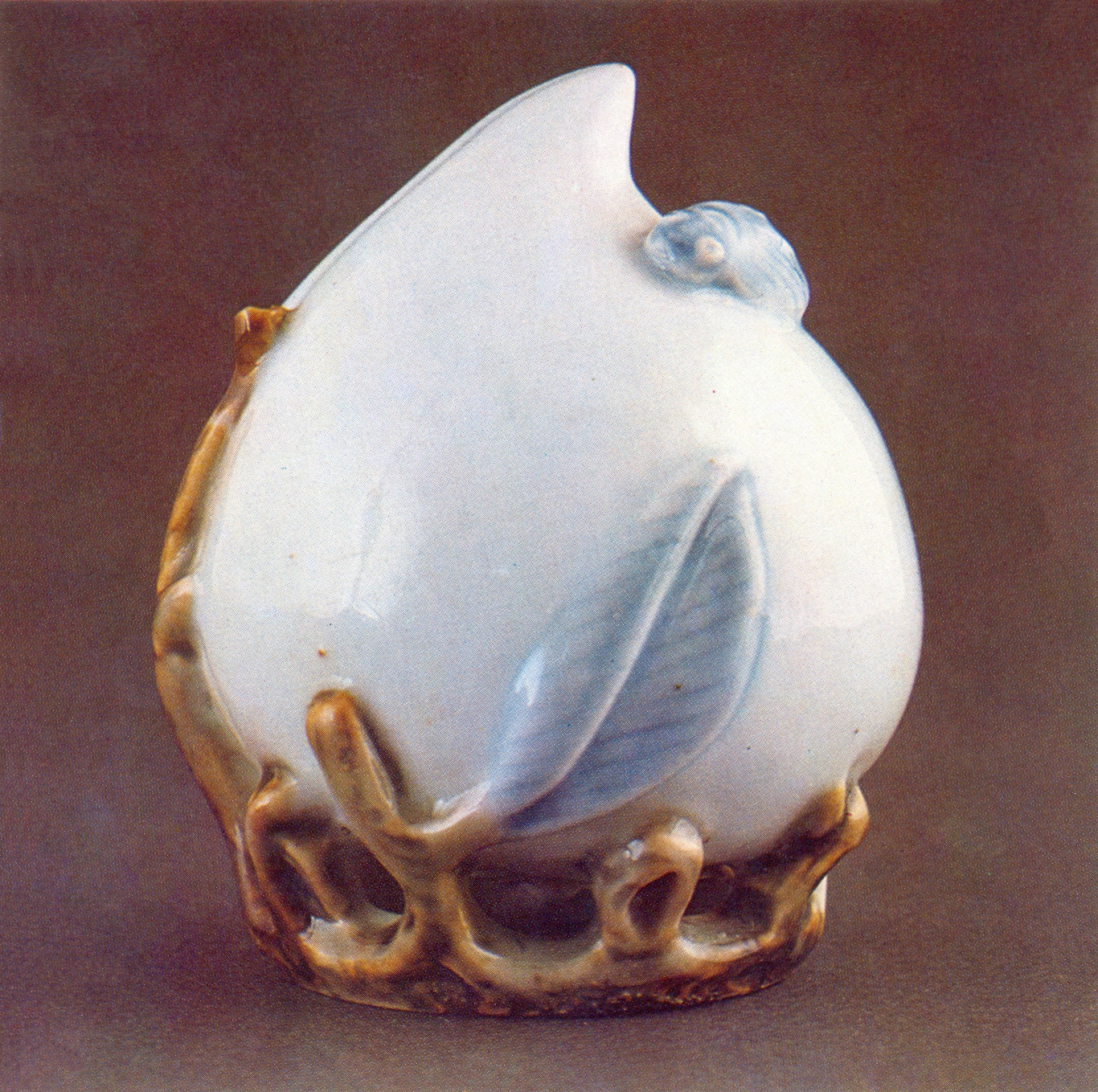
A blue and white porcelain peach-shaped water dropper from the Joseon Dynasty in the 18th century

=== Onggi ===
Onggi are Korean earthenware extensively used as pots and storage containers in Korea. It became a typical Korean garden material. It includes both unglazed earthenware, fired near 600 to 700°C, and pottery with a dark brown glaze fired at over 1100 °C. The origin of onggi dates to around 4000 to 5000 BC. The two types of earthenware include: patternless, mumun, and a red and black variety.

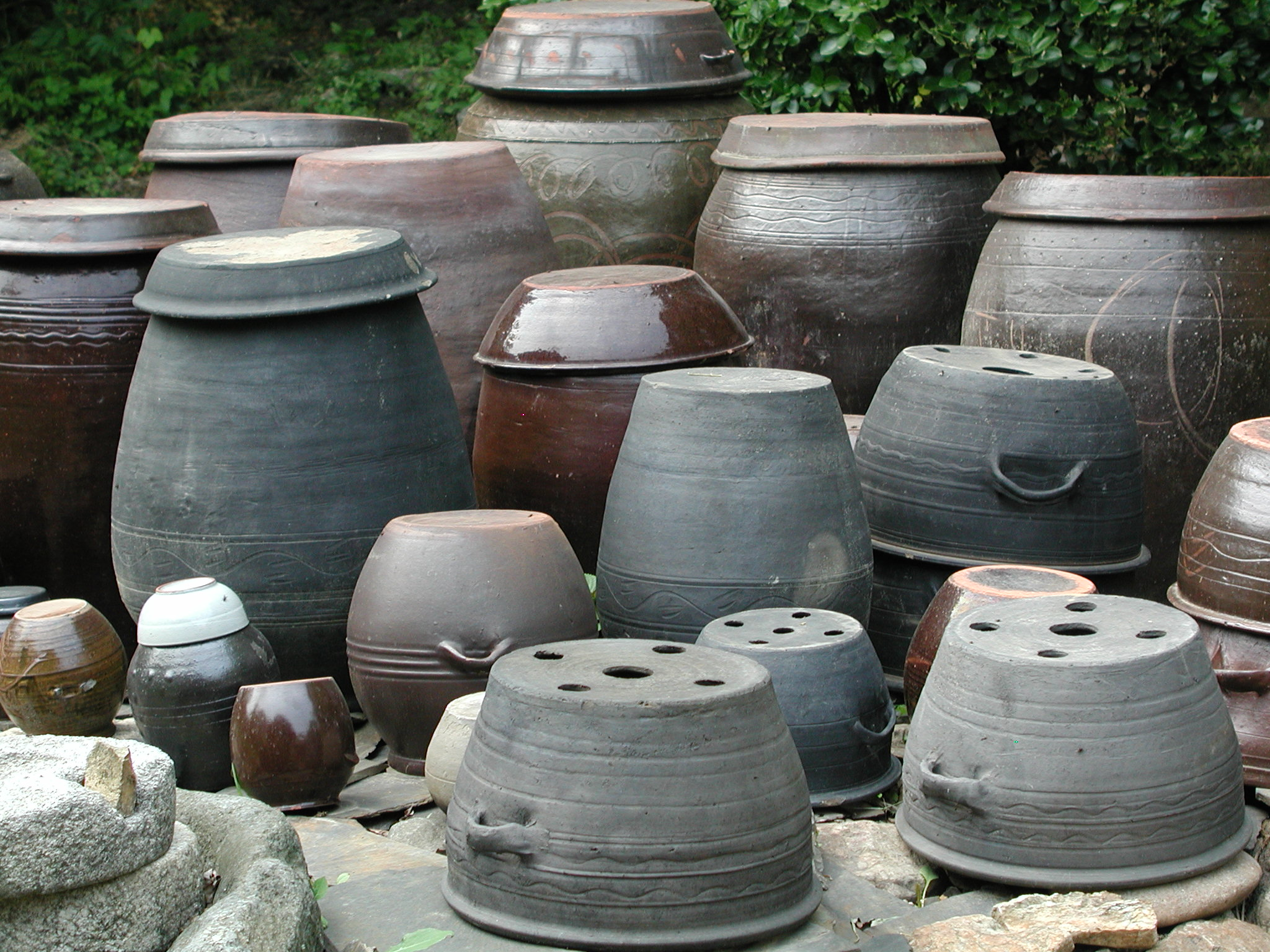
Onggi, usually kimchi, sauces or soybean paste are stored

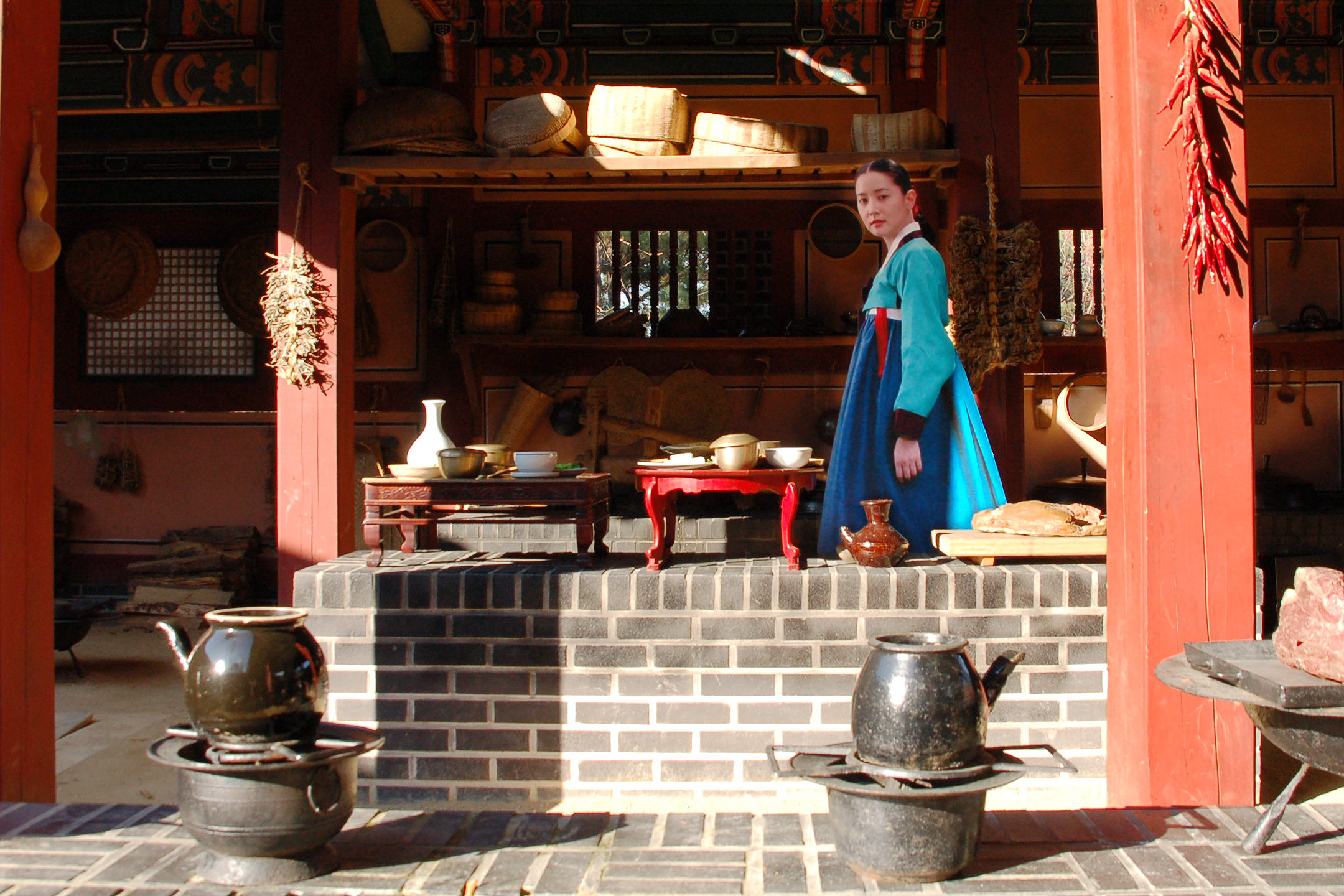
Used in Hanbang, Korean traditional herbal medicine pots to boil herbs

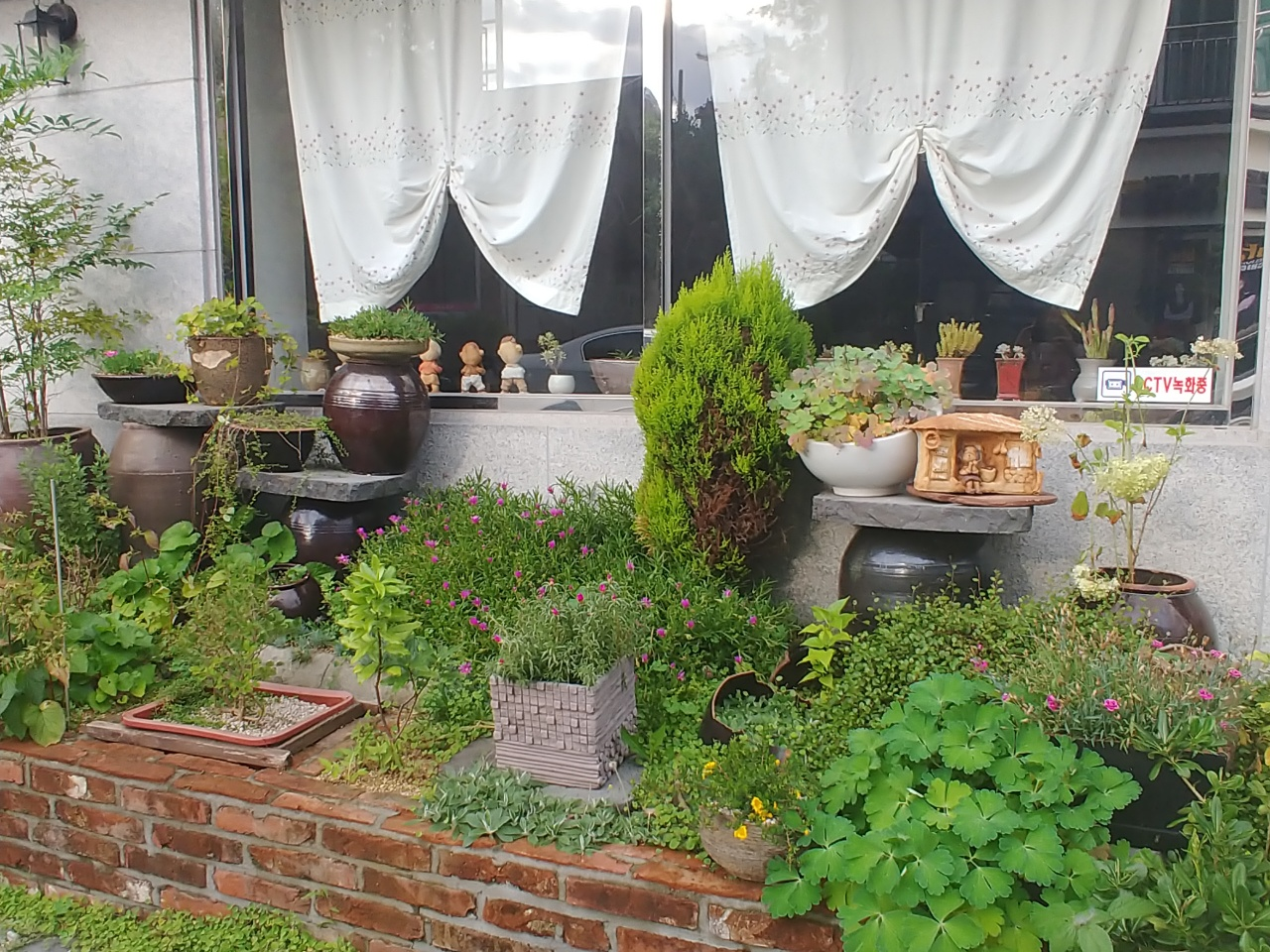
Today onggi is often used for decorating gardens.

=== Tombs of the Koryö elite: Burial practices and artifacts ===
The Tombs of the Koryö elite refer to a collection of burial sites dating back to the Koryö Kingdom, a medieval Korean dynasty that ruled from 918 to 1392. The first comprehensive survey of these tombs was conducted in 1916, resulting in the publication by the Government-General of Chosen, mapping around fifty stone chamber tombs located in the mountains surrounding Kaesöng. The majority of these tombs were reserved for members of the royal family and high-ranking officials, providing valuable insights into the burial practices and cultural nuances of the Koryö elite.

Architecture and Layout: Koryö royal tombs share similarities with Chinese imperial tombs from the Song dynasty (960–1279) but are smaller in scale. Typically, they feature a small earthen mound enclosed by a stone banister covering an underground tomb. The interior consists of a single stone chamber adorned with mural paintings depicting secular and Buddhist motifs. Some tombs, such as that of King Myöngjong, reveal a raised platform suggesting the interment of an extended body rather than cremated remains.

Coffin Ornaments: Archaeological findings within royal stone chambers indicate the use of wooden coffins adorned with bronze ornaments. Gilt-bronze coffin ornaments, including appliqué figures of the Four Guardian Animals and Buddhist apsaras, were attached to the coffin with nails. The coexistence of Buddhist iconography and Guardian Animals suggests a deliberate blending of ideologies, reflecting the pluralist nature of Koryö worldviews.

Stone Caskets: In some cases, stone caskets were placed inside the tombs, featuring engraved images of the Four Guardian Animals and occasionally lotus and apsaras. Unfortunately, none have been found in situ, making it challenging to determine their original purpose and contents. Some historical records suggest that stone boxes may have held cremated remains or artifacts, highlighting the diverse nature of Koryö burial practices.

Grave Goods and Celadon Wares: Discussions around stone caskets shed light on the arrangement and variety of burial goods within Koryö royal tombs. While grave robbers have looted many tombs, intact findings, such as celadon wares, bronze rings, and coins, offer valuable insights into the types of artifacts interred with the elite. Discussions also touch upon the challenges of interpreting the significance of grave goods due to looting.

Pit Graves: In contrast to royal stone chamber tombs, lower-ranking officials, local strongmen, and commoners were interred in pit graves. These graves, either earthen pit graves or stone-lined graves, contain fewer grave goods, with a decline in metal artifacts attributed to the Mongol invasions during the late 13th and 14th centuries. The construction methods and types of artifacts in pit graves indicate differences in social status.

The Tombs of the Koryö elite provide a glimpse into the burial practices, artistic expressions, and social hierarchies of the Koryö Kingdom. Despite challenges posed by looting and the passage of time, ongoing archaeological research continues to deepen our understanding of this historical and cultural heritage.

== Exports ==
Korean pottery was exported internationally during the Goryeo dynasty period (918–1392). It is from this that Korea received its exonym; the first name of Korea was Corée, it changed to Corea among English speakers. China also imported many Goryeo celadons. Exported Goryeo celadons are found in some countries in Europe, China, Japan, Thailand, Vietnam and Indonesia.

During the Joseon dynasty, the 'closed door policy' was implemented after attacks from France and the United States were repelled. Most exports during this period went to Japan, and most were from provincial coastal kilns, especially in the Busan area. Export occurred in two ways: either through trading or through invasion and theft of pottery and the abduction to Japan of families of potters who made the wares. The voluntary immigration of potters was improbable since Joseon pottery was administrated by the Ministry of Knowledge Economy (工曹). As a national resource, pottery technician trade with foreign countries was prohibited.

== Kilns ==
Central to Korean success were the chambered climbing kilns, based on the Chinese dragon kiln, that were used throughout the Joseon dynasty and exported abroad, especially to Japan by Korean kiln-makers where they were renamed as noborigama in the Karatsu area from the 17th century on. Modern kilns are either electric or gas-fired.

== Centers for studying Korean ceramics ==
- Department of Ceramics at the College of Art and Design, Ewha Womans University in Seoul
- Department of Ceramics at the College of Art and Design, Kongju National University in Gongju
- Korea Ceramic Foundation (KOCEF)
- Gwangju Gonjiam Ceramic Park, in Gwangju, Gyeonggi-do province

== See also ==
- Korean art
- List of Korean ceramic artists and sculptors
- Ceramic art
- Dragon jars (Korean)
- Yunggimun
- Celadon
- A Single Shard, a novel by Linda Sue Park in which the main focus is Korean pottery.
