= Sun-hee =

- Hangul: 선희
- RR: Seonhui
- MR: Sŏnhŭi
- IPA: [sʌnʝi]

Sun-hee, also spelled Son-hui or Seon-hui, is a Korean given name.

People with this name include:

- Consort Yeong (1696–1764), also known as Lady Seonhui, consort to Yeongjo of Joseon
- Lee Sun-hee (singer) (born 1964), South Korean singer
- Yoo Sun-hee (born 1967), South Korean female speed skater
- Mun Seon-hui (born 1968), South Korean voice actress
- Han Sun-hee (born 1973), South Korean team handball player
- Lee Sun-hee (taekwondo) (born 1978), South Korean taekwondo practitioner
- Woo Sun-hee (born 1978), South Korean team handball player
- Kil Son-hui (born 1985), North Korean football forward
- Kwak Ji-min (born Kwak Sun-hee, 1985), South Korean actress
- Hwang Sun-hee (born 1986), South Korean actress
- Chang Son-hui (장선희; 張善姬), North Korean actress who starred in the 1985 film Pulgasari

Fictional characters with this name include:

- Seonhee, a main character and playable party member in the 2024 video game Like a Dragon: Infinite Wealth. She first appeared as a supporting character in the game's 2020 predecessor Yakuza: Like a Dragon, where she was referred to as Seong-hui. The developers of this game series later stated that this was a mistranslation from Korean to Japanese, which was then translated into English.
- Sunhi, the titular character of 2013 South Korean film Our Sunhi
- Kim Sun-hee, one of the main characters in When My Name Was Keoko by Linda Sue Park
- Sun-hee, a character in The Boys Diabolical who had terminal pancreatic cancer.

== See also ==
- List of Korean given names
