= Lee Sun-hee =

- Hangul: 이선희
- RR: I Seonhui
- MR: I Sŏnhŭi

Lee Sun-hee (Korean: 이선희) is a Korean name consisting of the family name Lee and the given name Sun-hee, and may also refer to:

- Lee Sun-hee (baseball) (born 1955), South Korean baseball player
- Lee Sun-hee (singer) (born 1964), South Korean singer
- Lee Sun-hee (taekwondo) (born 1978), South Korean taekwondo practitioner
