= Yunggimun pottery =

- Hangul: 융기문토기
- Hanja: 隆起文土器
- Revised Romanization: Yunggimun Togi
- McCune–Reischauer: Yunggimun T'ogi

Yunggimuntogi, yunggimun pottery or Deotmunitogi (덧무늬토기) is the oldest type of Korean pottery. The name literally means "raised-design pottery"; it has also been called "pre-slant earthenware". Dated to circa 5,000 BCE, yunggimun pottery were flat-bottomed wares decorated with relief designs, raised horizontal lines and other impressions.

This style of pottery is characterized by pinched, raised decoration, plain raised and raised and impressed lines.

This style of pottery has been found in northeast Korea in addition to other regions. Some sites at which yunggimun pottery have been found include Sangnodaedo (island located in Yokjimyeon Tongyeong), Osan-ri (in Sonyangmyeon, Yangyang County) and Dongsam-dong (at Yeongdo District, Busan).

== See also ==
- Jeulmun pottery period
- Prehistoric Korea

== Bibliography ==
- Sarah M. Nelson (2004). Korean social archaeology: early villages. Jimoondang. ISBN 978-89-88095-01-0.
- Jane Portal (20 March 2000). Korea: art and archaeology. British Museum. ISBN 978-0-7141-1487-3.
- Joanna Rurarz (2009). Historia Korei. Dialog. ISBN 978-83-89899-28-6.
