= A Single Shard =

2001 novel by Linda Sue Park

- First edition
- Author: Linda Sue Park
- Cover artist: Jean and Mon-sien Tseng
- Language: English
- Genre: Historical novel
- Publisher: Clarion Books
- Publication date: April 23, 2001
- Publication place: United States of America
- Media type: Print (hardback & paperback)
- Pages: 148
- ISBN: 0-395-97827-0
- OCLC: 44803112
- LC Class: PZ7.P22115 Si 2001

A Single Shard is a novel by Linda Sue Park, set in 12th-century Korea. It won the 2003 Newbery Medal, awarded for excellence in children's literature. It also received an honorable mention from the Asian/Pacific American Awards for Literature.

== Reception ==
A Single Shard is the Newbery Award-winning novel by Linda Sue Park. The New York Times praised A Single Shard as being "deftly shaped" and "surprisingly moving", stating that the Newbery Medal would help expose the novel to an audience it would otherwise have not reached.

== Plot ==
Tree-ear is an orphan who lives under a bridge with Crane-man, a physically disabled man who took him in when Tree-ear was only a small child, about 4 years old. The potters of Ch'ulp'o, the local village, suddenly become famous for their celadon glaze, but Tree-ear has observed richer pickings in their rubbish dumps. He becomes very interested in watching the potters at work, especially an old potter called Min, famous for the beauty of his wares. Tree-ear enjoys watching Min at work more than any other potter because only Min possesses enough confidence to work openly. Tree-ear learns Min's daily habits and always sneaks up to the same paulownia tree to watch Min at work. One day, Tree-ear goes into Min's yard, but since neither the old potter nor his throwing wheel are in sight, he decides to investigate the work left drying in the sun. He sees a duck-shaped water dropper, a jug and a box that Tree-ear picks up. When Min comes out and startles Tree-ear, he drops and breaks the box by accident. As Tree-ear leaves, he hears Min muttering that the box he had dropped was made in three days. To pay for his mistake, Tree-ear offers to work for Min thrice the number of days to pay for the box. Min agrees.

Tree-ear arrives for his first day of work, excited to learn the potter's craft. However, Min wants Tree-ear to cut wood for the communal kiln. For nine days, Tree-ear cuts wood for Min. When the nine days are over, Tree-ear returns to Min and requests a continuing job. Min informs Tree-ear that the only pay would be a daily meal, but Tree-ear only wants to learn the trade and does not expect payment. Min agrees, sending Tree-ear to the river for clay.

Time passes, and one afternoon, word spreads throughout Ch'ulp'o that a royal emissary called Kim is coming to offer commissions to the best potters both in their village and another village down the coast. Every potter begins working at a fast pace to have their best work ready to display. During this time, Tree-ear notices some odd behavior in another potter, Kang, who is as experienced as Min but more impatient. He notes that Kang has been very secretive, carrying small bowls filled with semiliquid clay (slip) that seem to be colored, and carrying jars, wine cups, jugs, and vessels back and forth from the kiln early in the morning. One morning, Tree-ear spies on Kang, who trips while carrying two small bowls. The contents of both bowls slosh over on the ground. Tree-ear looks at the spill and sees two differently colored slips, red and white. One night, Tree-ear sneaks up to Kang's work shed and sees him carving out chrysanthemums on the side of a vase and then filling the holes with colored clay. Tree-ear wants to tell Min what he has seen, but he is concerned that by doing so he would be stealing from Kang, so he waits.

On the day that the royal emissary arrives, all the potters set up stalls filled with their work on the beach. Min's is the smallest display but it is one of a few that earns extra attention from the Emissary Kim as he admires the melon-shaped jug that is put on the display. The emissary leaves, but announces that he will return in a month to offer commissions. The potters who received extra attention before again begin working quickly to prepare new samples for the emissary. Tree-ear tells Min about Kang's inlay work. Min immediately begins creating inlays in his own pottery. However, after the pottery is fired in the kiln, it all comes out with brown stains that sometimes appear in the finish. Min breaks them all and prepares to start over. Unfortunately, the emissary arrives before he can create anything new. After a few days, news comes out: Kang has been chosen for a commission. When he visits Min's house and hears the story, the emissary offers to give Min a commission if he can bring a sample to the capital city, but Min confesses that he believes he is too old for such a trip.

Tree-ear overhears the conversation between Min and the emissary and offers to take a sample of Min's work to Songdo for him, as a gift to Min who has befriended and cared for Tree-ear over the past year. Once again, Min works quickly to create two apple-shaped vases with intricate, inlaid flowers along the side. Crane-man is hired to create a basket that will carry the vases without breaking them. After taking care to be sure Crane-man will be cared for during his absence, Tree-ear sets off alone for the capital city. Tree-ear walks alone for days. When he reaches the city of Puyo, he goes up to a mountain cliff called the Rock of Falling Flowers. At the top of the cliff, Tree-ear is attacked by two robbers who steal all his coins and throw the vases over the edge of the cliff to the river below. After they have gone, Tree-ear rushes down to the river to check on the fate of the vases. Both vases are broken but one has broken in large pieces, allowing Tree-ear to take a single shard of the broken vase and continue his journey.

When Tree-ear arrives in Puyo, he sees the familiar chrysanthemums and colors on a stall selling pottery. When the stall owner sees Tree-ear's interest, he tells him that the work was already one of the King's favorites. Tree-ear talks his way into a meeting with the emissary when he arrives at the palace. Tree-ear reveals his attack by the robbers and then shows the single shard. Despite the incredulity of the emissary's assistant, Min is offered a commission and Tree-ear is given safe passage home on a ship. Once home, Tree-ear goes directly to the home of Min to tell him about the commission. Min has news for Tree-ear as well. Crane-man died a few days before when a farmer's cart broke the rotten bridge railing, causing him to fall into the cold water. Tree-ear is devastated by this news and afraid for his own future. However, Min's wife tells him that he is to move in with her and her husband. They give Tree-ear a name that is part of their deceased son's name Hyung-gu. They name him Hyung-pil. Later, Min reveals that he intends to teach Tree-ear/Hyung-pil the art of pottery. The ending of the story reveals that Tree-ear, or Hyung-pil, created the "Thousand Cranes Vase", which is the finest example of inlaid celadon pottery from in the twelfth century.

Awards
Preceded by A Year Down Yonder	Newbery Medal Award; 2002	Succeeded by Crispin: The Cross of Lead
