= The Kite Fighters =

2000 novel by Linda Sue Park

- First edition cover
- Author: Linda Sue Park
- Illustrator: Eung Won Park
- Language: English
- Genre: Children's fiction
- Published: 2000, Clarion Books
- Publication place: United States
- Media type: Print, ebook, audiobook
- Pages: 144 pages
- ISBN: 0395940419

The Kite Fighters is a 2000 historical children's novel that was written by Linda Sue Park and illustrated by her father Eung Won Park. It was first published on March 20, 2000, through Clarion Books and follows two brothers in Korea during the 15th century.

== Plot ==
Set in Seoul, Korea, in 1473, the novel depicts the relationship of two brothers in a tradition-bound family. Lee Young-sup is acutely aware of the difference in his status being a younger brother, but he finds a true talent the first time he flies a kite. First-born son Kee-sup is under pressure from his father, a rice merchant, to advance the family honor by becoming a court official; he spends much of his time studying for the position, though it is not his true life goal. Young-sup's growing expertise in flying kites and Kee-sup's craft in making them draw the attention of the boy-king of Korea, modeled after King Songjong, and they become friends with the king outside of the ancient protocol and secretly represent him for them kite-fighting competition during the New Year's festival. It is the tension between traditional duties and individual needs.

== Reception ==
Critical reception has been positive. January Magazine praised The Kite Fighters for "[painting] a realistic picture of coming of age in Korea in 1473" and "[relaying] a timeless, compelling story that easily translates to our own age". Kirkus Reviews also gave the book a positive rating, as they appreciated the book's resolution came out of the hard work of several people as opposed to it being a "foregone conclusion".
