= Dragon jar =

Korean porcelain jar

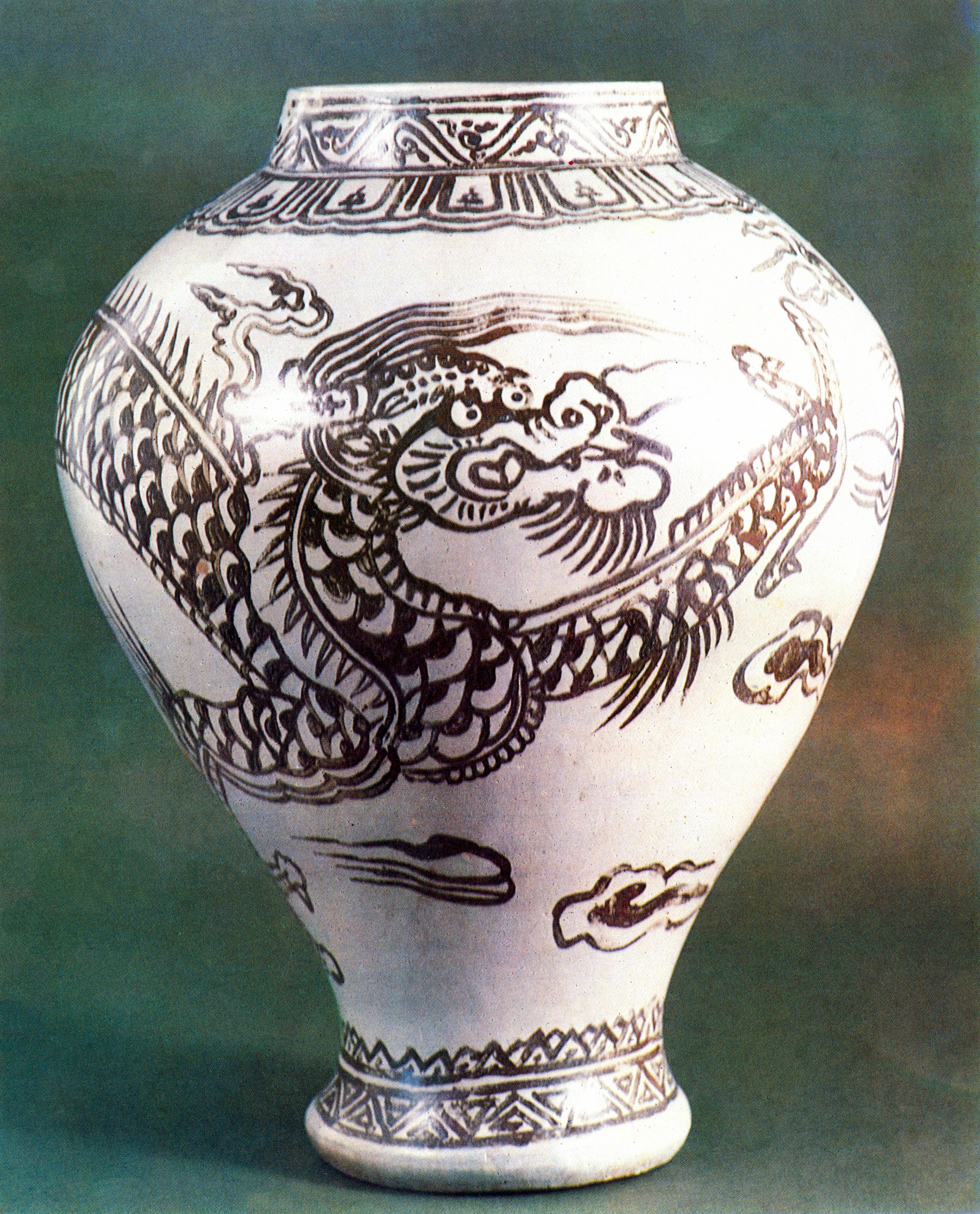
Joseon white porcelain jar with underglaze iron dragon and cloud design (National Treasure)

A dragon jar, also known as cloud-dragon jar, is a type of ceremonial porcelain vessel that became popular among the ruling classes of Korea during the Joseon Dynasty (1392–1910). They are decorated with large dragons against a background of stylized clouds, painted with underglaze pigments.

In addition to being a generally auspicious symbol, the dragon represented the authority and beneficence of the ruler. In 1754, King Yeongjo decreed that iron pigments were to be used exclusively, except for jars having a dragon design. Because of the scarcity of the traditional cobalt blue pigment, which was imported from Muslim Turkestan, and was also known as “Mohammedan blue”, an underglaze brown iron oxide pigment was also used between the seventeenth and nineteenth centuries.
