= Linda Sue Park =

Korean-American author (born 1960)

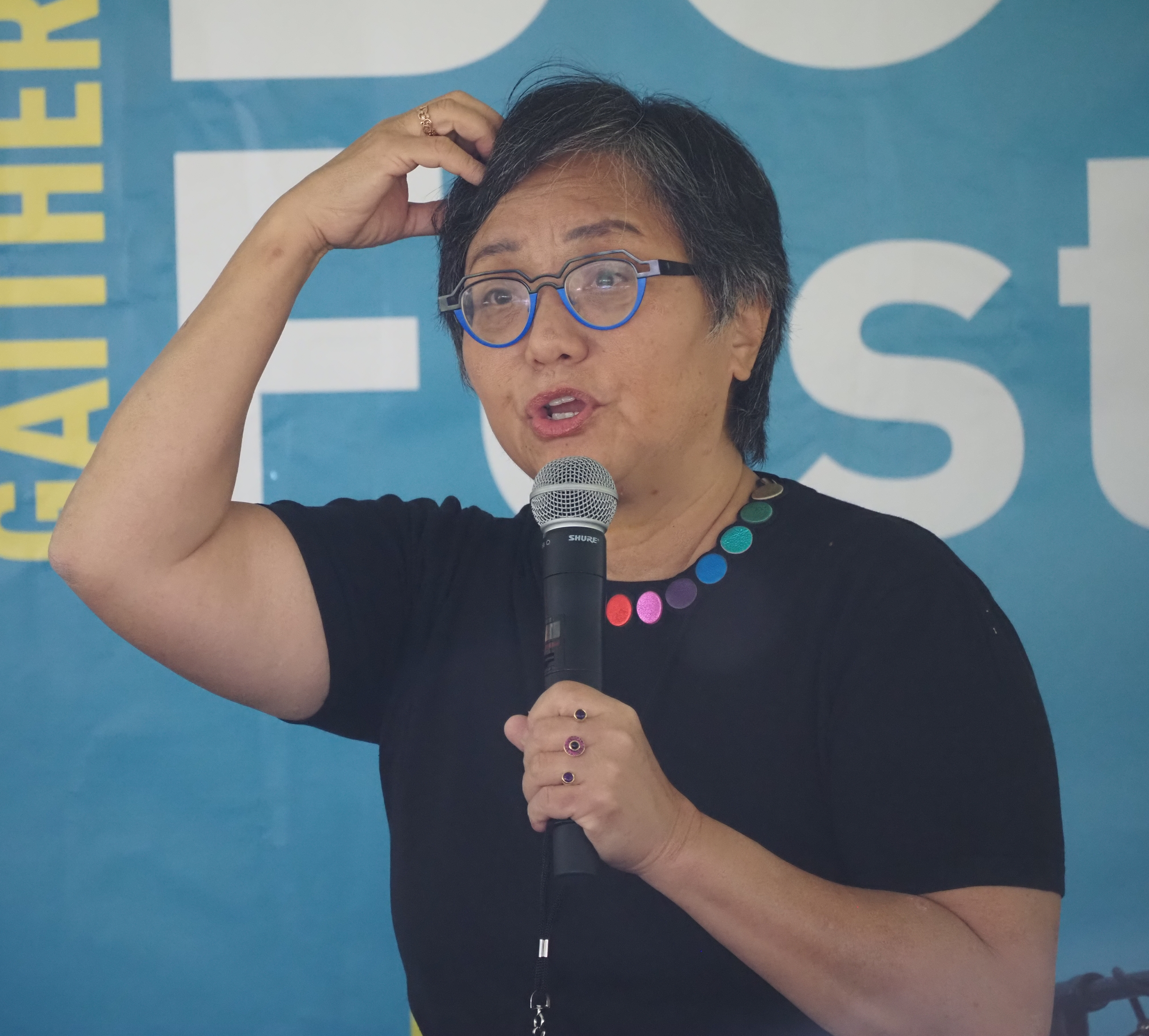
- Park at the 2026 Gaithersburg Book Festival
- Born: March 25, 1960 (age 66); Urbana, Illinois, U.S.
- Education: Stanford University (BA); University of London (MA)
- Occupation: Writer
- Writing career
- Genres: Young adult fiction, poetry
- Notable awards: Newbery Medal; 2002

Korean name
- Hangul: 박명진
- RR: Bak Myeongjin
- MR: Pak Myŏngjin
- Website: lindasuepark.com

Linda Sue Park (born March 25, 1960) is a Korean-American author who published her first novel, Seesaw Girl, in 1999. She has written six children's novels and five picture books. Park's work achieved prominence when she received the prestigious 2002 Newbery Medal for her novel A Single Shard. She has written the ninth book in The 39 Clues, Storm Warning, published on May 25, 2010.

== Personal life ==
Linda Sue Park was born on March 25, 1960, in Urbana, Illinois, and was raised outside Chicago. Linda Sue Park's parents immigrated to the United States in the 1950s, for their education. Park has been writing poetry and stories since the age of four. Park published her first poem when she was nine years old for Trailblazer magazine. Through elementary and high school, she continued to publish poems in magazines for children and young people. She published her first book in 1999, Seesaw Girl.

Park competed on the gymnastics team at Stanford University and graduated with a Bachelor of Arts in English. She also obtained advanced degrees in literature from Trinity College in Ireland and a Master of Arts from the University of London.

Before writing her first book, Park worked at many jobs, including public relations for a major oil firm, food journalism for British magazines and newspapers, and teaching English as a second language to college students.

Park lives with her family in Rochester, New York.

== Themes ==
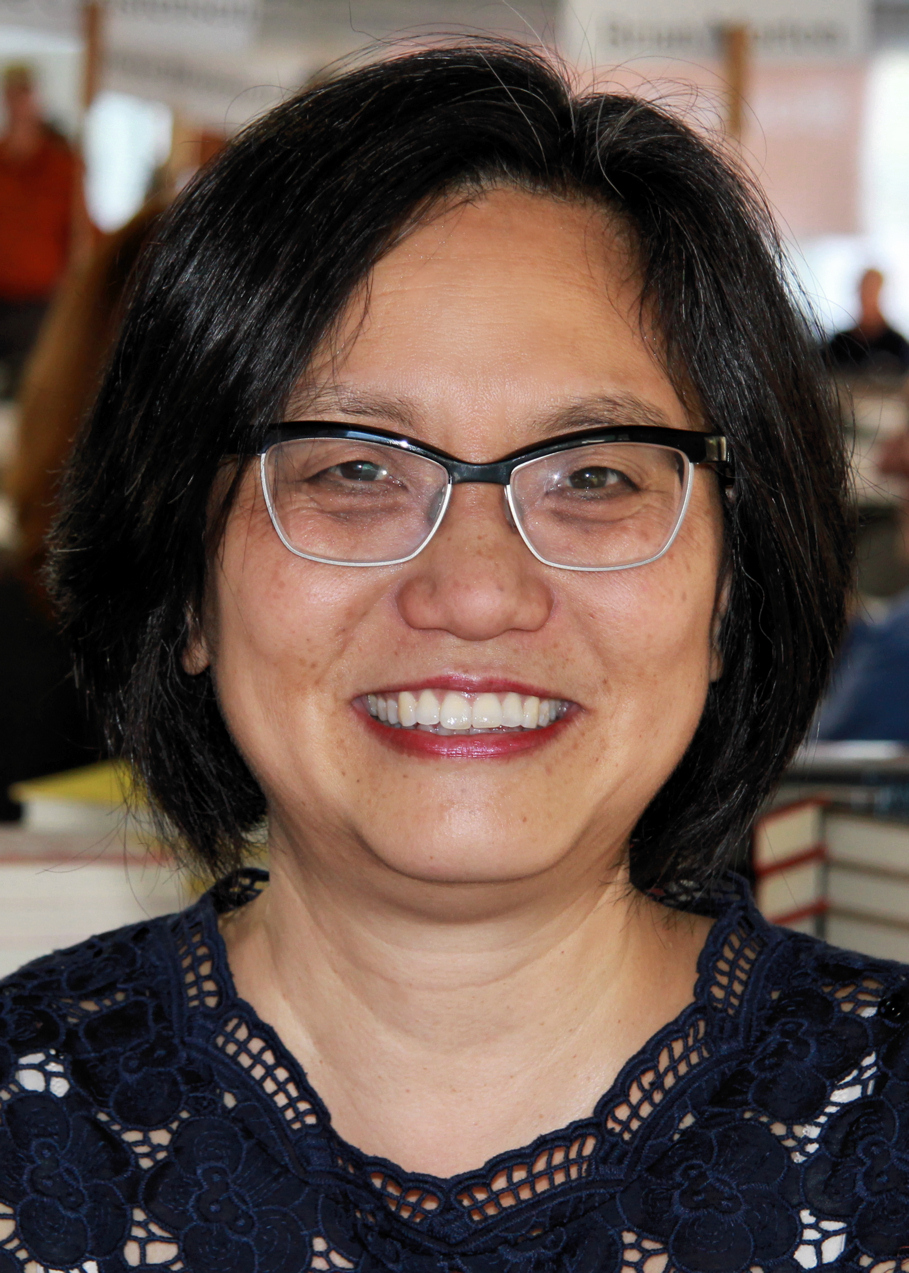
Linda Sue Park at the 2014 Texas Book Festival.

Park is best known for her historical fiction. With the exception of three picture books and two novels, all of Park's books center upon Korean history and Korean culture. Her first three novels are set in ancient or medieval Korea. However, her fourth novel, When My Name Was Keoko, is about the more recent history of the Japanese occupation of Korea during World War II. Project Mulberry occurs in a contemporary setting outside Chicago. Park's book, Archer’s Quest, introduces a historical figure into modern times. Park shares her passion for baseball in her book, Keeping Score. Park's book, A Long Walk to Water, features family friend Salva Dut and his childhood experience growing up in the Sudan as well as another character, Nya who spends her entire day gathering and transporting water to her family.

Park researched her Korean heritage for her books, demonstrated by historical details within the story along with sections for author's notes and bibliographies. Her topics feature characteristic elements of Korean culture, including: embroidery (Seesaw Girl); kite fighting (The Kite Fighters); celadon pottery (A Single Shard); silkworms (Project Mulberry); Korean food (Bee-Bim Bop); and archery (Archer’s Quest). She also continues to publish poetry.

== Works ==
=== Novels ===
- Seesaw Girl (1999)
- The Kite Fighters (2000)
  - Junior Library Guild Selection, Spring 2000
  - Notable Books for a Global Society
  - Bank Street Best Children's Book of the Year
- A Single Shard (2001)
  - Newbery Medal 2002
  - Asian/Pacific American Awards for Literature Honorable Mention
- When My Name Was Keoko (2002)
  - Jane Addams Honor citation
  - Publishers Weekly Best Books of the Year
  - School Library Journal Best Books of the Year
- Project Mulberry (2005)
  - Chicago Tribune Young Adult Fiction Award
  - Asian/Pacific American Awards for Literature, Honorable Mention
- Archer's Quest (2006)
- Click: One novel ten authors, chapter one (2007)
- Keeping Score (2008)
- Storm Warning (2010), 39 Clues series
- A Long Walk to Water (2010)
- The Chronicles of Harris Burdick (The Harp, 2011), contributor, Illus. by Chris Van Allsburg
- Trust No One (2012), 39 Clues series
- Forest of Wonders (2016), Wing and Claw trilogy, Illus. by Jennifer Black Reinhardt
- Cavern of Secrets (2017), Wing and Claw trilogy, Illus. by Jim Madsen
- Beast of Stone (2018), Wing and Claw trilogy, Illus. by Jim Madsen
- Prairie Lotus (2020)

=== Picture books ===
- Mung-Mung: A Foldout Book of Animal Sounds (2004), Illus. by Diane Bigda
- The Firekeeper's Son (2004), Illus. by Julie Downing
  - Irma S. and James H. Black (ISB) Honor, 2005
  - Asian/Pacific American Awards for Literature, Best Illustration in Children's Literature
- Yum! Yuck! A Foldout Book of People Sounds From Around the World (2005), Co-authored by Julia Durango, Illus. by Sue Ramá
  - ALA Notable Children's Books, 2006
- Bee-bim Bop (2005), Illus. by Ho Baek Lee
- What Does Bunny See? A Book of Colors and Flowers (2005), Illus. by Maggie Smith
- Tap Dancing on the Roof: Sijo Poems (2007), Illus. by Istvan Banyai
  - The Lion and the Unicorn Prize for Excellence in North American Poetry
  - ABC Children's Booksellers Choice Award
- The Third Gift (2011), Illus. by Bagram Ibatoulline
- Xander's Panda Party (2013), Illus. by Matt Phelan
- Yaks Yak: Animal Word Pairs (2016), Illus. by Jennifer Black Reinhardt

=== Poetry ===
- "On Meeting a Poet," "Changing the Sheets," "Mobius," " Fourth-Grade Science Project," in Avatar Review
- "Handstand", in Atlanta Review, Spring/Summer 2000
- "Seven Sins: Portrait of an Aristocratic Young Woman," "Irreversible Loyalty," "A Little World," "The Ramparts at Calvi," in The Alsop Review
- "Armchair Journey," "Hyphen," in Miller's Pond, Spring 2002
- "Picturing the Words," "When the Last Panda Died," "Tide Pool," in Avatar Review, Summer 2004
