= When My Name Was Keoko =

2002 novel by Linda Sue Park

- 2011 edition cover
- Author: Linda Sue Park
- Cover artist: Carol Chu
- Language: English
- Subject: World War II
- Genre: Asian historic fiction
- Published: 2002, Clarion Books
- Publication place: United States
- Media type: Print, ebook, audiobook
- Pages: 199 pages
- ISBN: 978-0618133352
- OCLC: 47092263
- LC Class: PZ7.P22115 Wh 2002

When My Name Was Keoko is a 2002 historical fiction novel written by American author Linda Sue Park. First published on March 18, 2002 by Clarion Books, the novel is set in Korea during the period of Japanese rule in World War II. The narrative is presented through the alternating precatives of two Korean siblings, Tae-Yul and Sun-hee.

== Summary ==
This story takes place in Korea during the 1940s. This book is told through the different perspectives of Sun-Hee, (Note: Sun-hee is referred to by both "Sun-hee" and "Keoko". This article uses Sun-hee for consistency.) and her brother Tae-Yul. They, along with all Korean citizens, are forced to adopt new names in Japanese to reflect the new law put out by the Japanese government. Sun-hee's family chooses the last name of "Kaneyama" for the family because, when translated, ka-ne means gold and yama mountain. For their first names, each family member picks a random letter in the Japanese alphabet that will be the first letter of their name. Sun-hee chose the letter K and Tae-Yul chose N, so their names became Kaneyama Keoko and Kaneyama Nobuo. As the book progresses the story switches between Sun-hee time in school with her friend Tomo and interest in Japanese kanji, and Tae-Yul/Nobuo's interest in machinery.

Due to Japan attacking Korea, food is scarce, and Sun-hee and Tae-Yul's family members often fight with each other. Things grow tenser after the United States enters the war due to the attack on Pearl Harbor, giving Tae-Yul his first glimpse of an airplane, which prompts him to fantasize about flying one himself. Life for the siblings is relatively dull except for the occasional news given out by the neighborhood block leader. During this time all citizens are ordered to stop their activities and head out to the streets to listen to the news, which was given to the block leaders by government officials. One night Sun-hee is sent to deliver her uncle his dinner, as he has been spending more and more time at his job in a printing shop. On her way there she is stopped by her friend Tomo, who gives her a vague warning that she takes to mean that her uncle is in danger. Sun-hee's uncle runs off after hearing the warning and Tae-yul's narration reveals that their uncle had been printing newspapers for the resistance.

However, Sun-hee soon finds that Tomo's warning did not indicate that the government was aware of his activities with the Korean resistance, but that they were going to take all metal items (including the printing press) and donate them to the military. This means that her uncle's escape was for no reason, which became more tragic once his flight is announced by one of the neighborhood block leaders. As the days progress, the siblings hear more news about kamikaze pilots, which fascinates Tae-Yul. Eventually, Tae-Yul is approached by the police, who want him to arrange a meeting with his uncle. This puts Tae-Yul under a lot of pressure since accepting it would end with his uncle's arrest and refusing it would put him at the mercy of the government. He ends up enlisting in the Imperial Japanese Army as it would allow him to leave the country without having to accept or decline the police's request.

While Tae-Yul is in training, he overhears two Japanese officers joking and sneering about Koreans in relation to a volunteer mission, as they viewed them as too worthless and cowardly to volunteer. Because of this, Tae-Yul immediately volunteers, only to discover that it is for a kamikaze mission. Tae-yul is put through rudimentary flight training that is cut short due to a lack of Japanese soldiers. Tae-Yul secretly plans a way to escape the certain death that would come from his mission. He is spared from this fate when the day for the mission arrives as the weather makes it impossible for the pilots to successfully fly. Tae-Yul and the others return to base where they are arrested. Months later the block leaders announce that Japan had lost the war to the United States. Tae-yul returns home, where he confesses to his family that his plan was that when the time came, he would take out another kamikaze pilot instead of aiming at the American ships. Home and together again, Sun-hee teaches her brother the Korean alphabet, which she learned from their father after Korea was freed.

== Reception ==
Critical reception has been positive, and When My Name Was Keoko has received a review from the School Library Journal and two reviews from the Horn Book Guide. AudioFile praised the book's story while criticizing that the audiobook narration was "at times flat and without emotion". Publishers Weekly gave When My Name Was Keoko a starred review and wrote "Through the use of the shifting narrators, Park subtly points up the differences between male and female roles in Korean society and telling details provide a clear picture of the siblings and their world." Kliatt and Reading Time both praised the work and Kliatt commented that it would be of good use in classrooms, especially those focused in literary, history, or had "students of Korean roots and good students who like substance in their stories."

=== Awards ===
- CCBC Newbery Award Discussion
- Honor Book, CCBC Printz Award Discussion
