= Chulpo-ri =

Village in Chungcheongnam-do, South Korea

Coordinates: 36.8894615°N 126.4701621°E

- Hangul: 출포리
- Hanja: 出捕里
- RR: Chulpo-ri
- MR: Ch'ulp'o-ri

Chulpo-ri is a village in Daehoji County, Dangjin City, Chungcheongnam-do, South Korea. It was originally under the jurisdiction of the neighbouring Haemi County, Seosan City, but was reassigned to Daehoji County in 1957.

== History ==
Ch'ulp'o is a village that is mostly known for celadon pottery.
