= Vase with Cranes and Clouds =

12th-century Korean vase

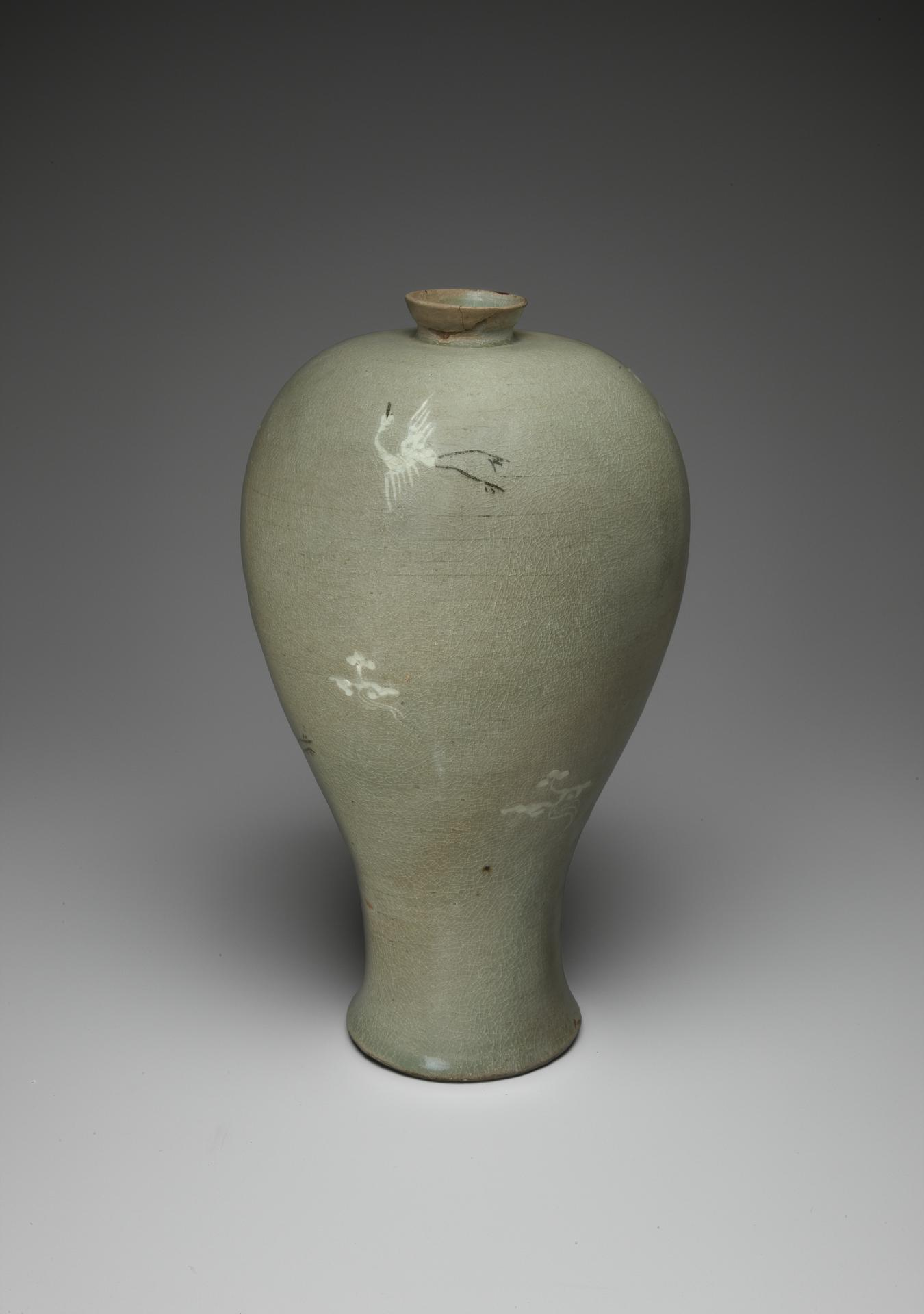
- Completion date: 12th century
- Medium: Celadon with inlaid slip design under green glaze
- Movement: Goryeo ware
- Subject: Cranes on maebyong vase
- Dimensions: 33.02 cm × 18.415 cm (13 in × 7 1/4 in)
- Location: Yale University Art Gallery, New Haven, Connecticut
- Accession: 2008.129.1
- Website: https://artgallery.yale.edu/collections/objects/132067

Vase with Cranes and Clouds is a 12th century vase from the Goryeo period. The vase is a maebyeong, derived from the meiping (plum vase – 梅瓶), and is considered a popular style for its time in the history of Goryeo ware, with a style that diverges from Chinese celadon ware. The piece is currently held at the Yale University Art Gallery, acquired via the Leonard C. Hanna, Jr in 2008, with previous ownership being from a Japanese collection, acquired by Lt. Col. Oliver Perry Shaffer post-World War II.

== Description ==
The meiping/maebyeong style, originally utilized as a vase to store wine, was converted as a way to display plum blossoms for decorative purposes. After centuries of trade and imports from China, the distinctive Goryeo ware evolved in the domestic market, with designs derived from Yue ware (light green color) and Qingbai ware in the 9th-10th centuries, in addition to Longquan celadon from the Song dynasty, with the common route of exchange between Ningbo and Kaesong

In the Xuanhe fengshi Gaoli tujing, a book recording the trade and relations between Song China and Goryeo Korea, the author, Xu Jing, described Goryeo ware, at the time influenced by Yue and Ru ware, as the "radiance of jade and the clarity of water".

The distinction between the meiping and the maebyeong can be seen by the narrower bottom and the increased flare of the vase. The Yale vase in typical maebyeong fashion, has a small mouth, wide upper bottom, and slim base, creating tension in shape. It used to have a lid but has been long lost.

The design, depicting cranes and clouds, were initially carved into the body of the clay when partially hardened, followed by layers of slip, white for the crane's body and the clouds, the black for the crane's beak and legs. This technique of decorative inlay saw popularity in the Goryeo period as well as Vietnam, but was rarely found in Chinese or Japanese pottery.

The motif of cranes in Goryeo pottery saw peak popularity in the 12-13th centuries, as symbols of longevity based in Daoist practice. Contemporary to that of the vase include Song dynasty paintings such as Auspicious Cranes by Emperor Huizong. The vase's utilization of cranes on Goryeo celadon symbolizes that auspiciousness.

Another vase contemporary to that of the Yale vase is held by the Metropolitan Museum of Art, acquired in 1911 through Sadajirō Yamanaka.
