= Makeup Museum =

Cosmetic industry museum in Manhattan, New York

- Established: 1 September 2020
- Location: New York City, U.S.
- Coordinates: 40°44′21″N 74°0′32″W
- Website: makeupmuseum.com

The Makeup Museum is a museum dedicated to cosmetics located in Manhattan, New York City. The Makeup Museum opened on September 1, 2020, at 94 Gansevoort St., across the street from the Whitney Museum of American Art.

The Makeup Museum's debut exhibition was titled "Pink Jungle: 1950s Makeup in America" which included 1950s artifacts such as a collection of vintage compacts, eyeliners, mascaras, lipsticks and powders.

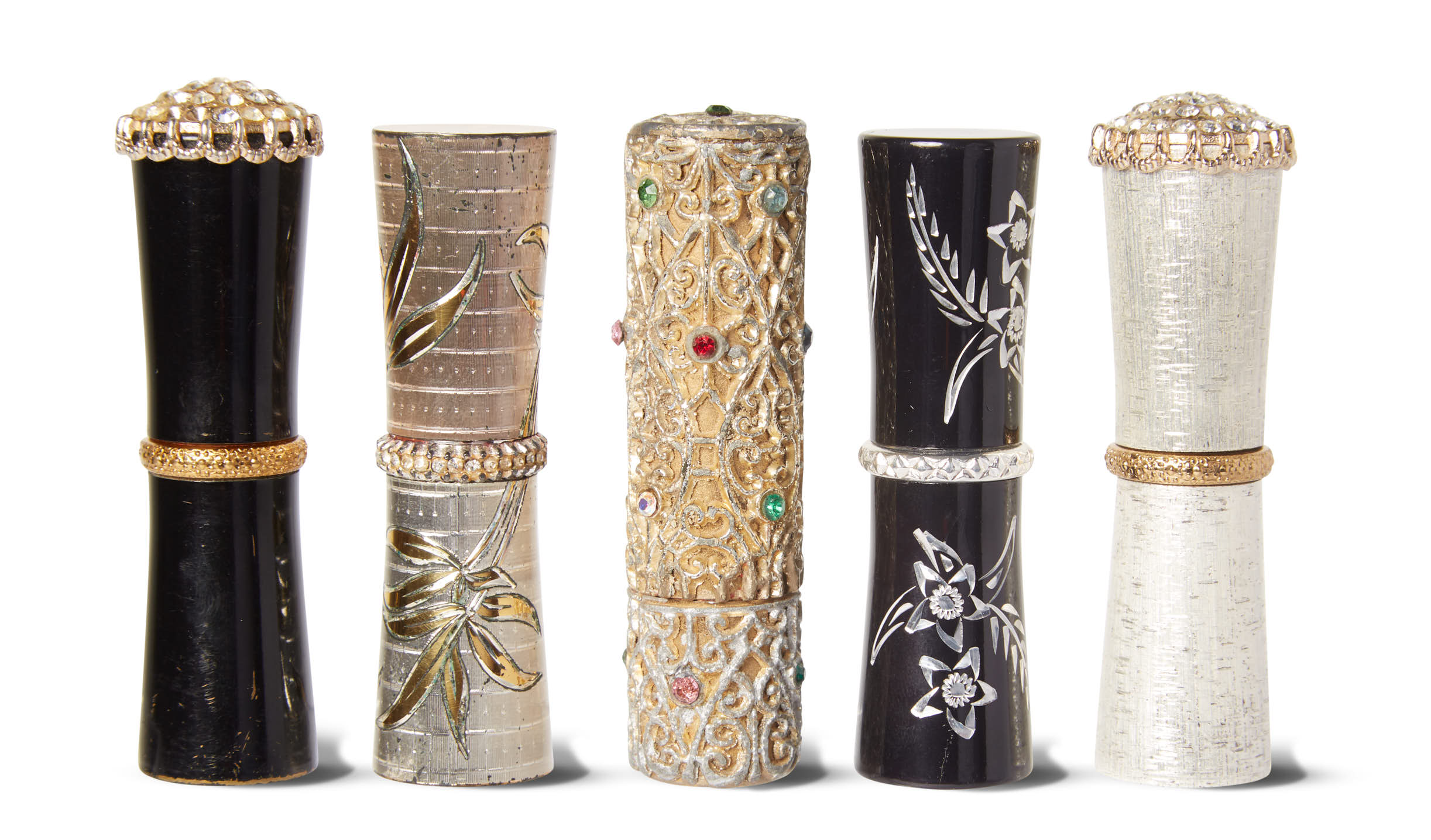

The Makeup Museum was founded in 2018 by celebrity makeup artist Rachel Goodwin, former Makeup.com editor Caitlin Collins, and beauty entrepreneur Doreen Bloch. The Makeup Museum's collections include artifacts spanning over 5,000 years of cosmetics history, including an Ancient Egyptian Kohl (cosmetics) eyeliner jar and a Qingbai ware cosmetics box from the Northern Song dynasty dated 960–1127 CE.
