= Maebyeong =

Type of Korean vessel

- Maebyeong celadon vase with sanggam engraved cranes (National Treasure No. 68)

Korean name
- Hangul: 매병
- Hanja: 梅甁
- RR: maebyeong
- MR: maebyŏng

Maebyeong (Korean: 매병) refers to Korean vessels with a small slightly curled mouth rim, short neck, round shoulder, and constricted waist. The maebyong is derived from the Chinese meiping (literally "plum vase"). Unlike the Chinese meiping, the Korean maebyeong vase usually flares outward at the base. They were first used to hold wine and later branches of plum blossoms.

Some of these vessels have a cup-shaped cover over the mouth, so that they seemed to be used to store high quality wine such as insamju (인삼주, ginseng wine) or maehwaju (매화주; rice wine made with plum) It would have originally had a lid and there are many maebyong with ginseng leaves on the surfaces.

== Ju-byeong vase or bottle shape ==
A common name for the maebyeong is the "male vase". The corresponding "female vase" is called a ju-byeong (Korean: 주병) . South Korean potters frequently make sets of matching maebyeong and jubyeong vases that are usually purchased as a gift for a newly wed couple. The combination of a maebyeong and jubyeong is also called a vase and bottle.

== Gallery ==
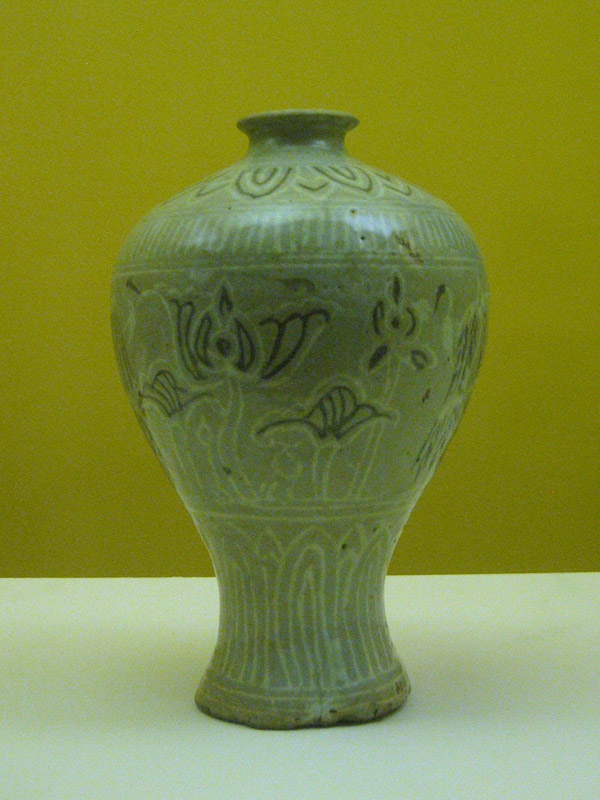

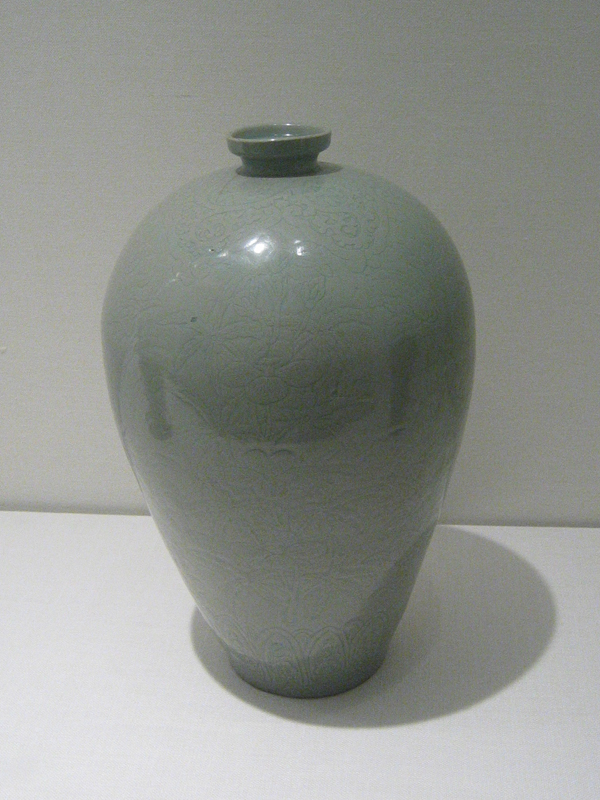

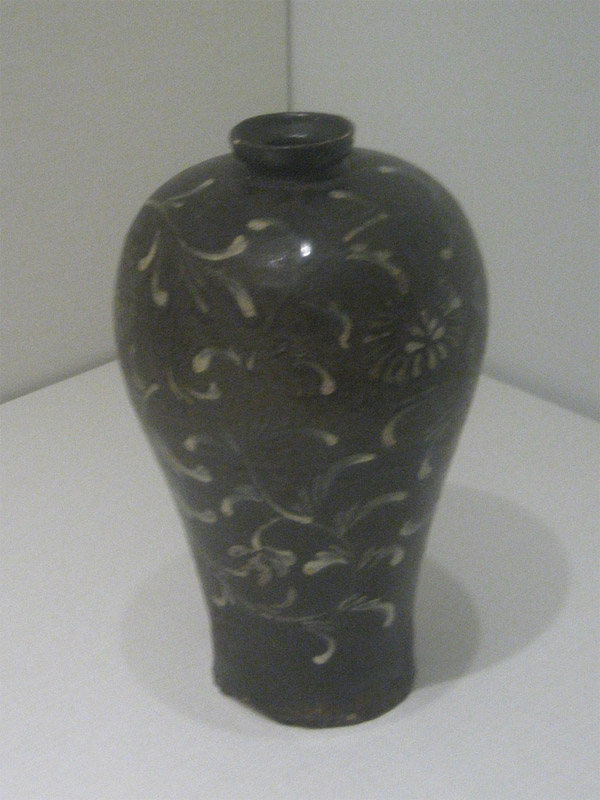

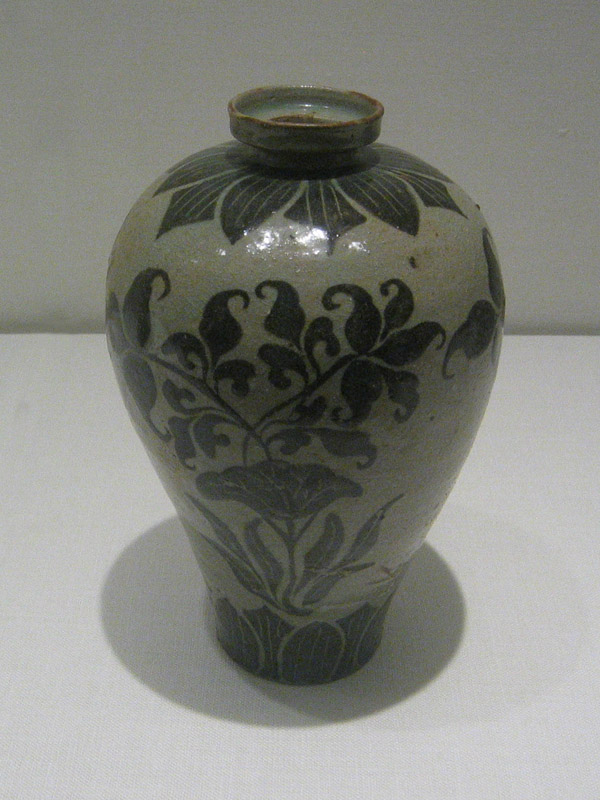

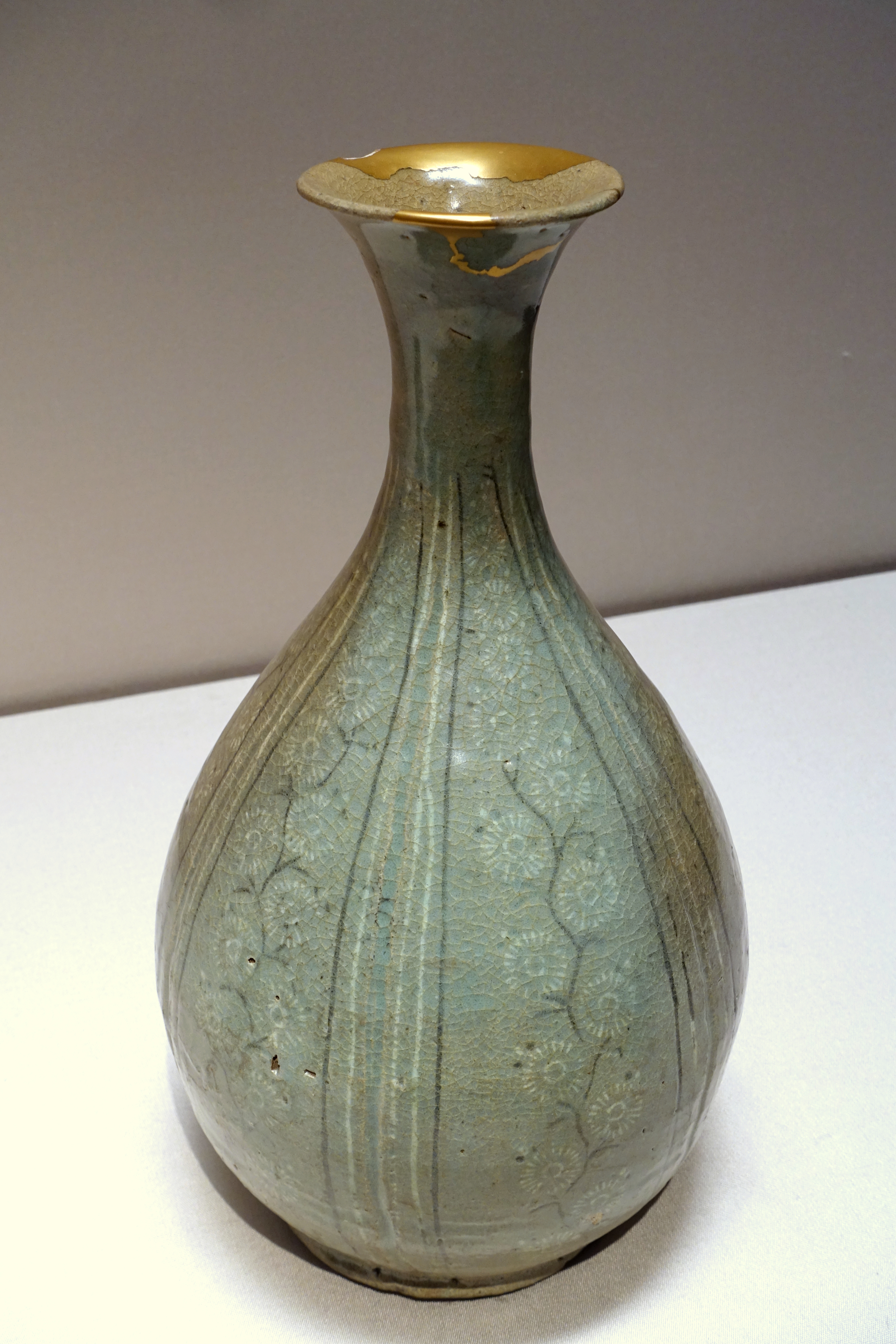
Ju-byeong style

== See also ==
- Korean pottery and porcelain
- Buncheong
- Joseon white porcelain
- Vase with Cranes and Clouds
