= Meiping =

Type of vase in Chinese ceramics

A meiping (Chinese: 梅瓶; pinyin: méipíng; lit. 'plum vase') is a type of vase in Chinese ceramics. It is traditionally used to display branches of plum blossoms. The meiping was first made of stoneware during the Tang dynasty (618–907). It was originally used as a wine vessel, but since the Song dynasty (960–1279) it also became popular as a plum vase and got its name "meiping". It is tall, with a narrow base spreading gracefully into a wide body, followed by a sharply-rounded shoulder, a short and narrow neck, and a small opening.

They may have lids, and many lids have no doubt been lost. The equivalent shape in Korean ceramics, where it was derived from Chinese examples, is called a Maebyeong. A distinct variant is the "truncated meiping", where there is only the top half of the usual shape, giving a squat vase with a wide bottom. This is largely restricted to Cizhou ware.

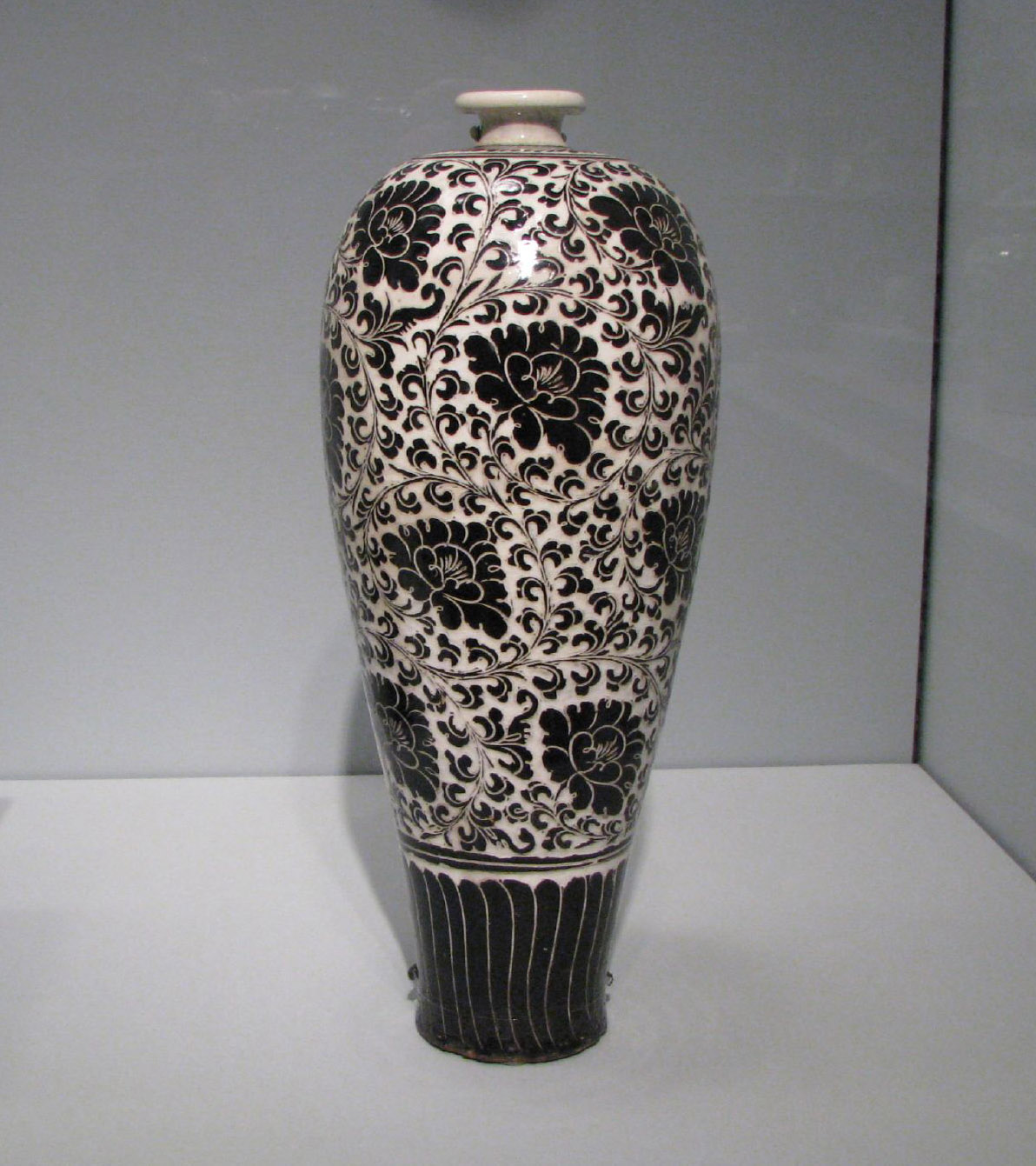
Cizhou ware, 13th century, Song dynasty

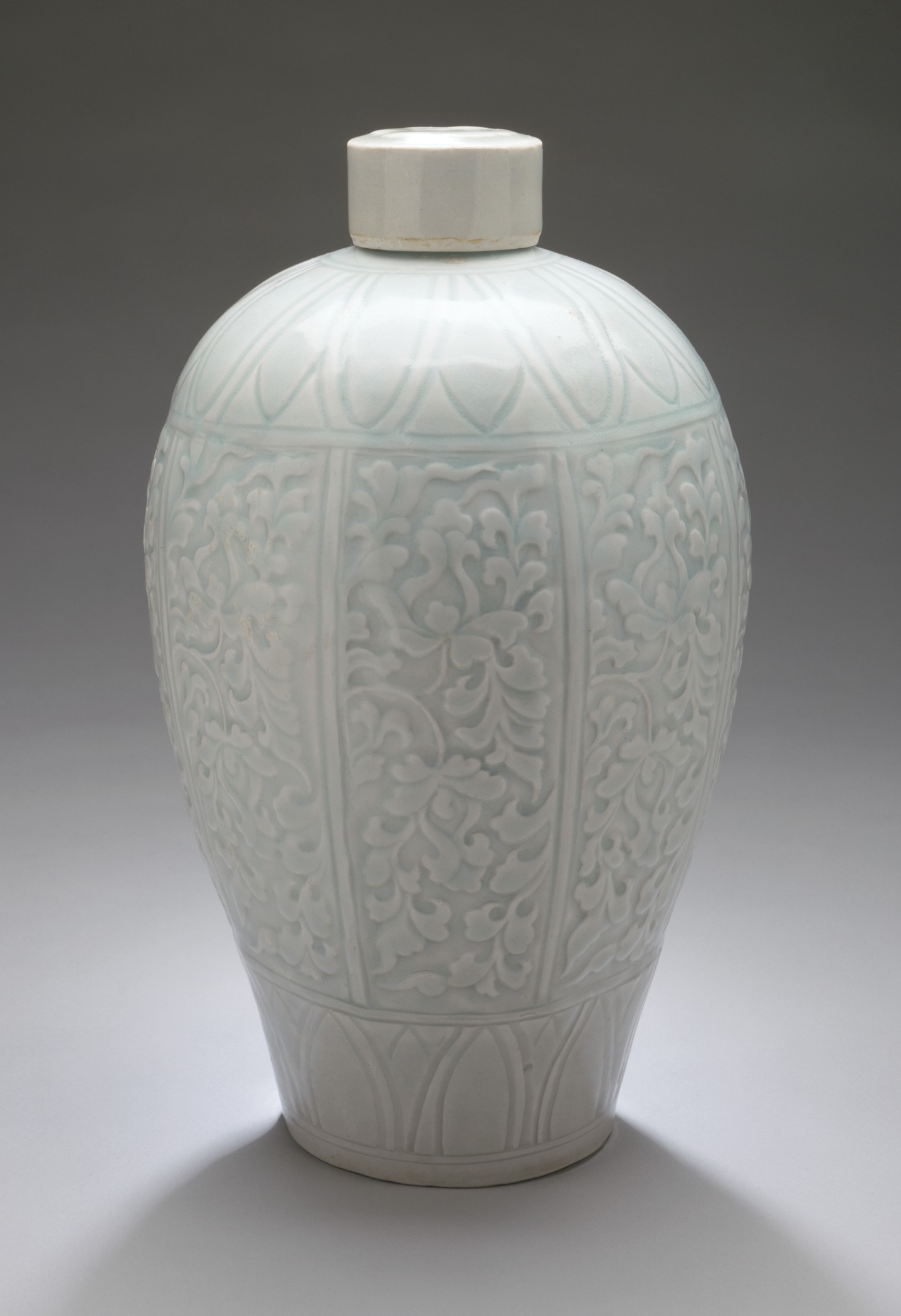
Lidded vase with lotus sprays, Qingbai ware, Southern Song period

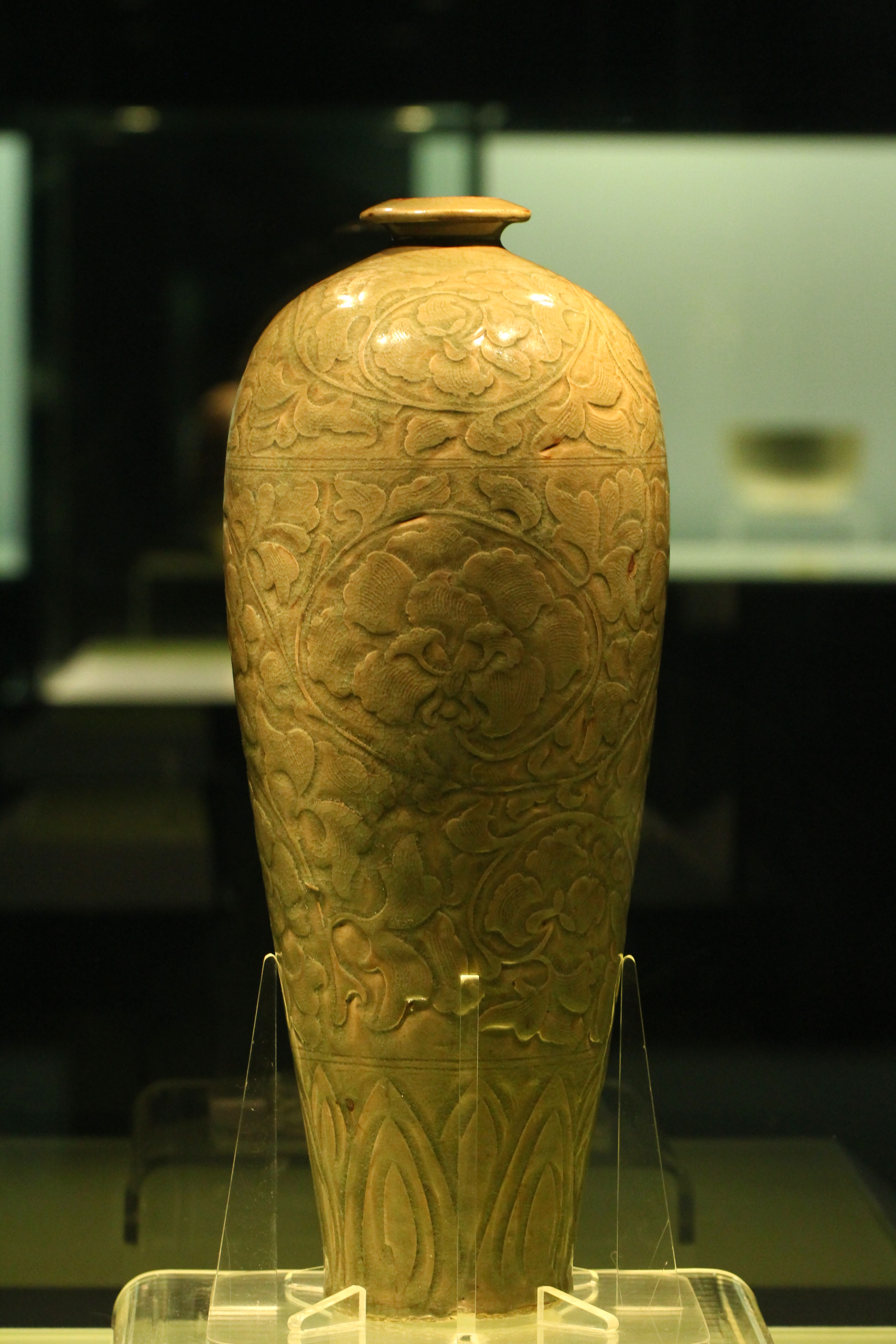
Yaozhou ware, celadon, Song dynasty

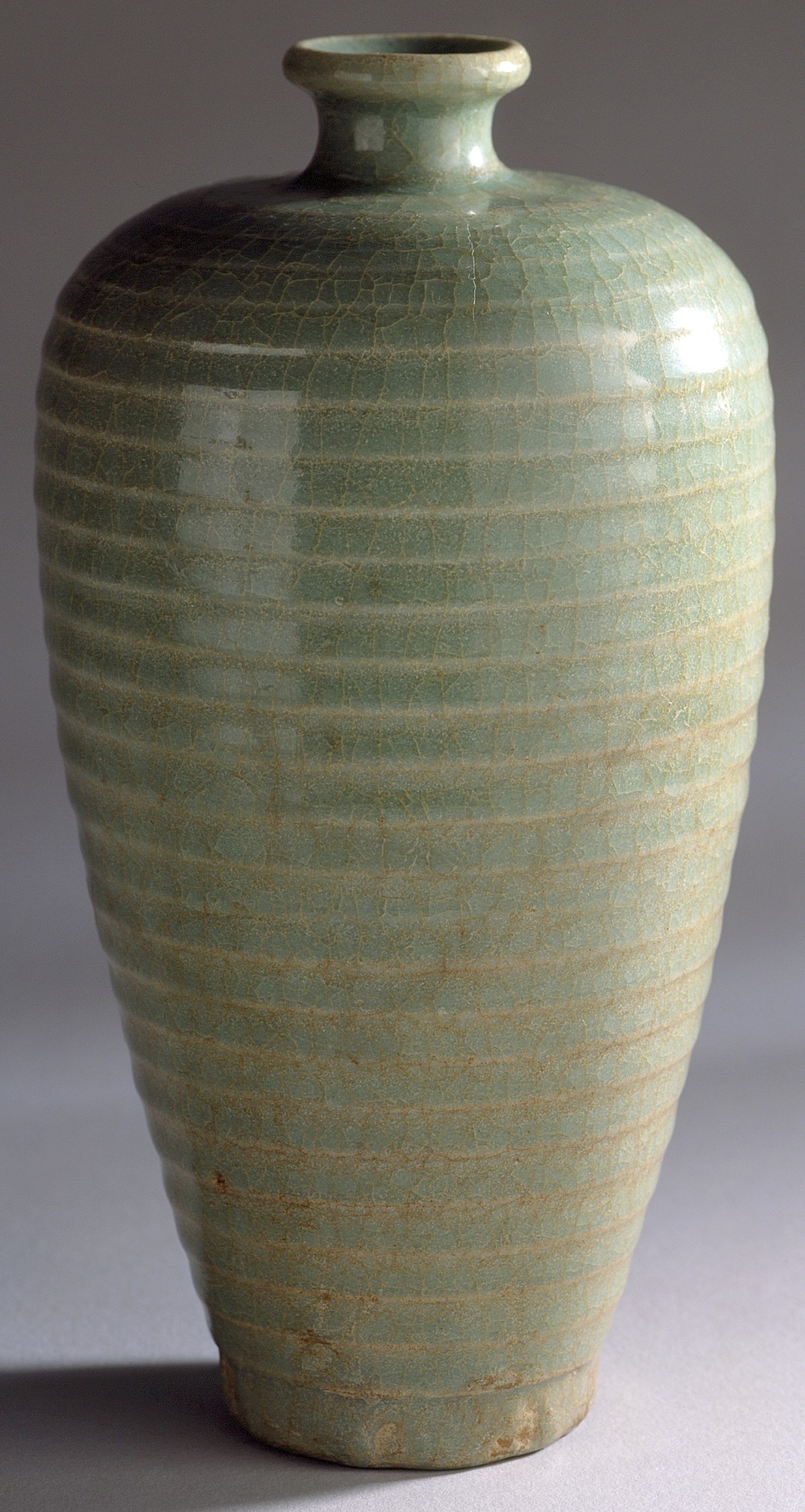
Vase with horizontal ribs, Southern Song period

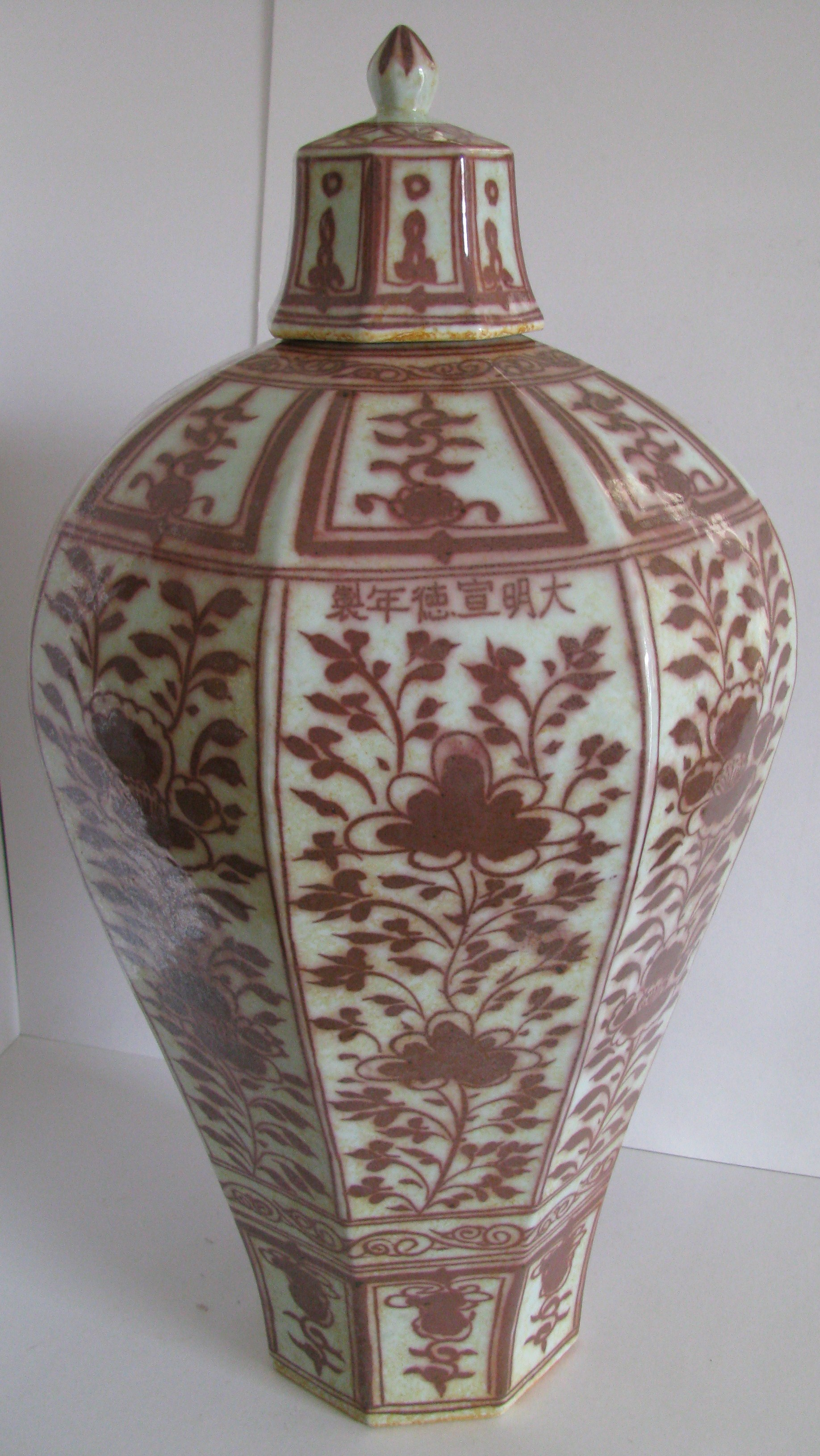
Vase with copper-red underglaze, Ming dynasty

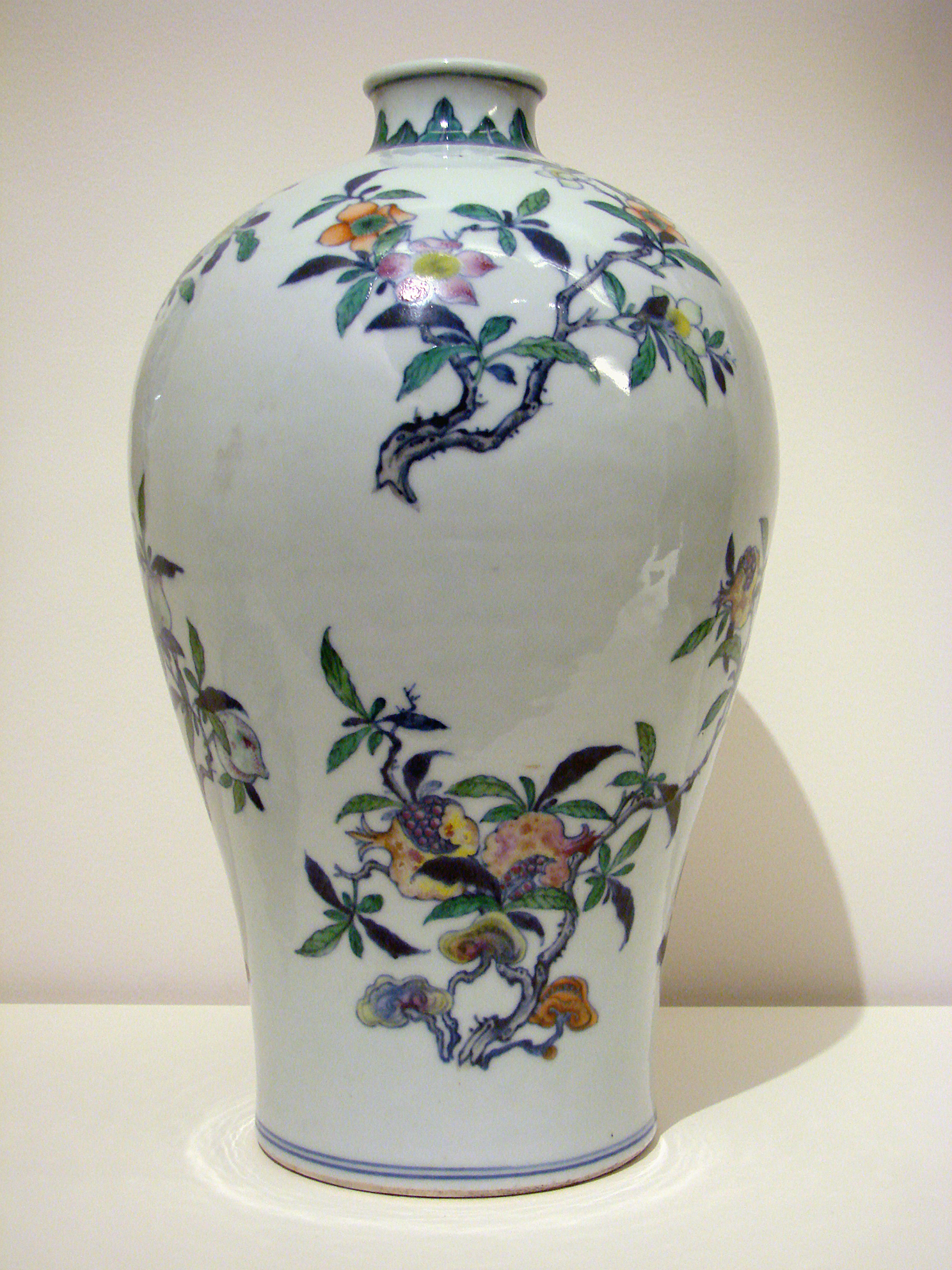
18th-century vase

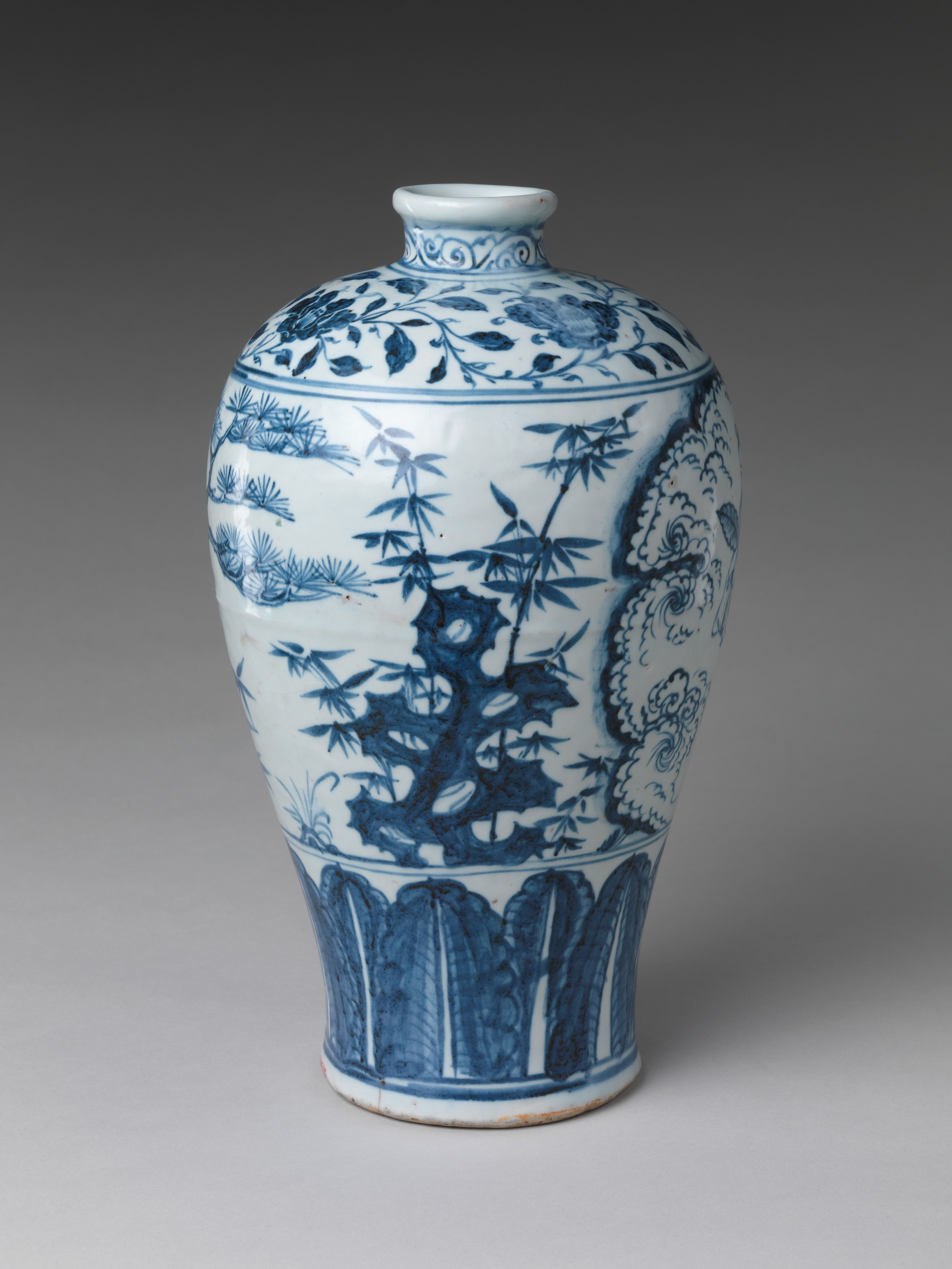
Porcelain, Jingdezhen ware, painted with cobalt blue under transparent glaze, 15th century

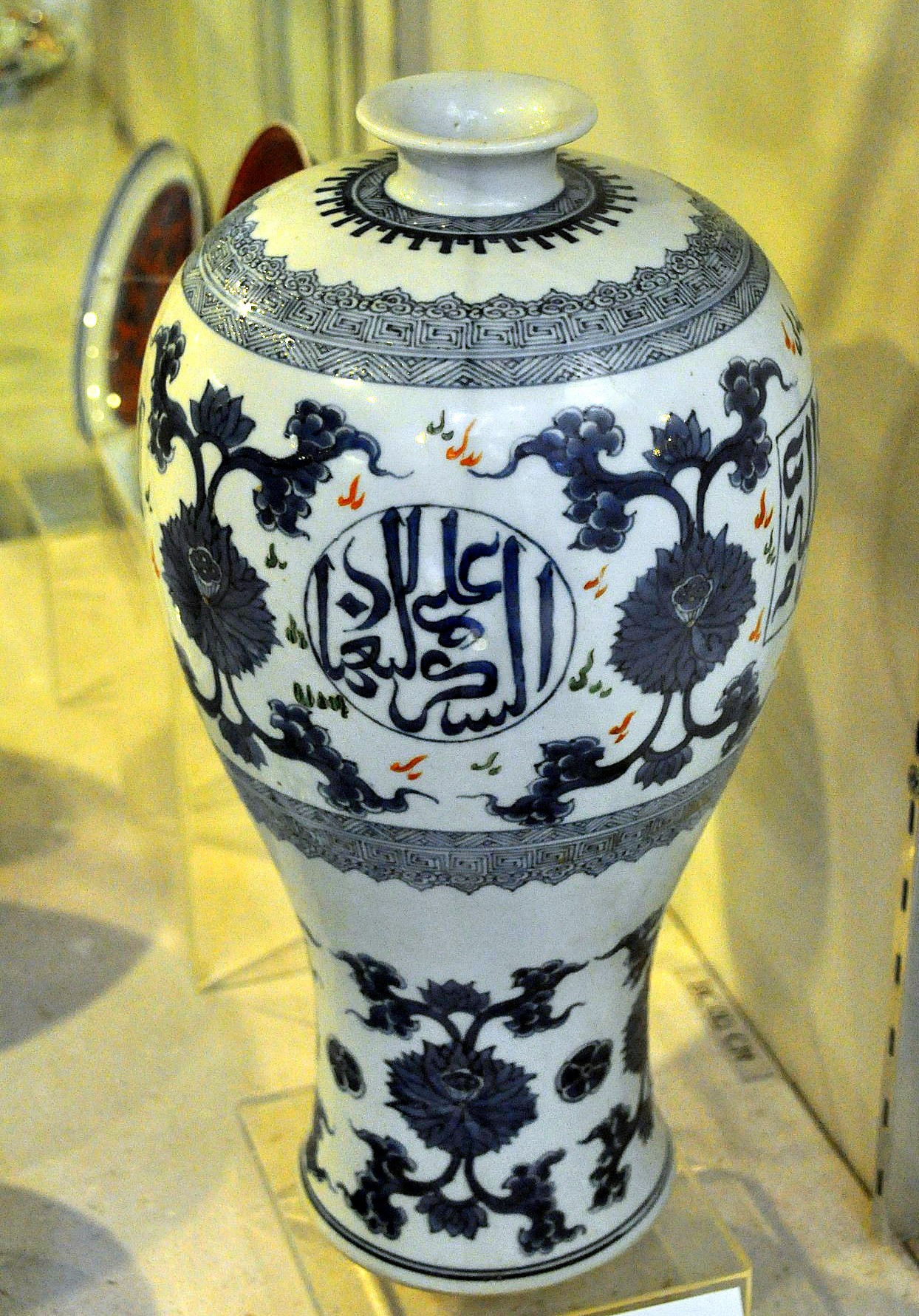
Meiping vase, Chinese, Ming dynasty, 16th century CE. Arabic inscription. Porcelain with underglaze blue and small touches of overglaze enamel. Burrell Collection, Glasgow, UK
