= Qingbai ware =

Type of Chinese porcelain

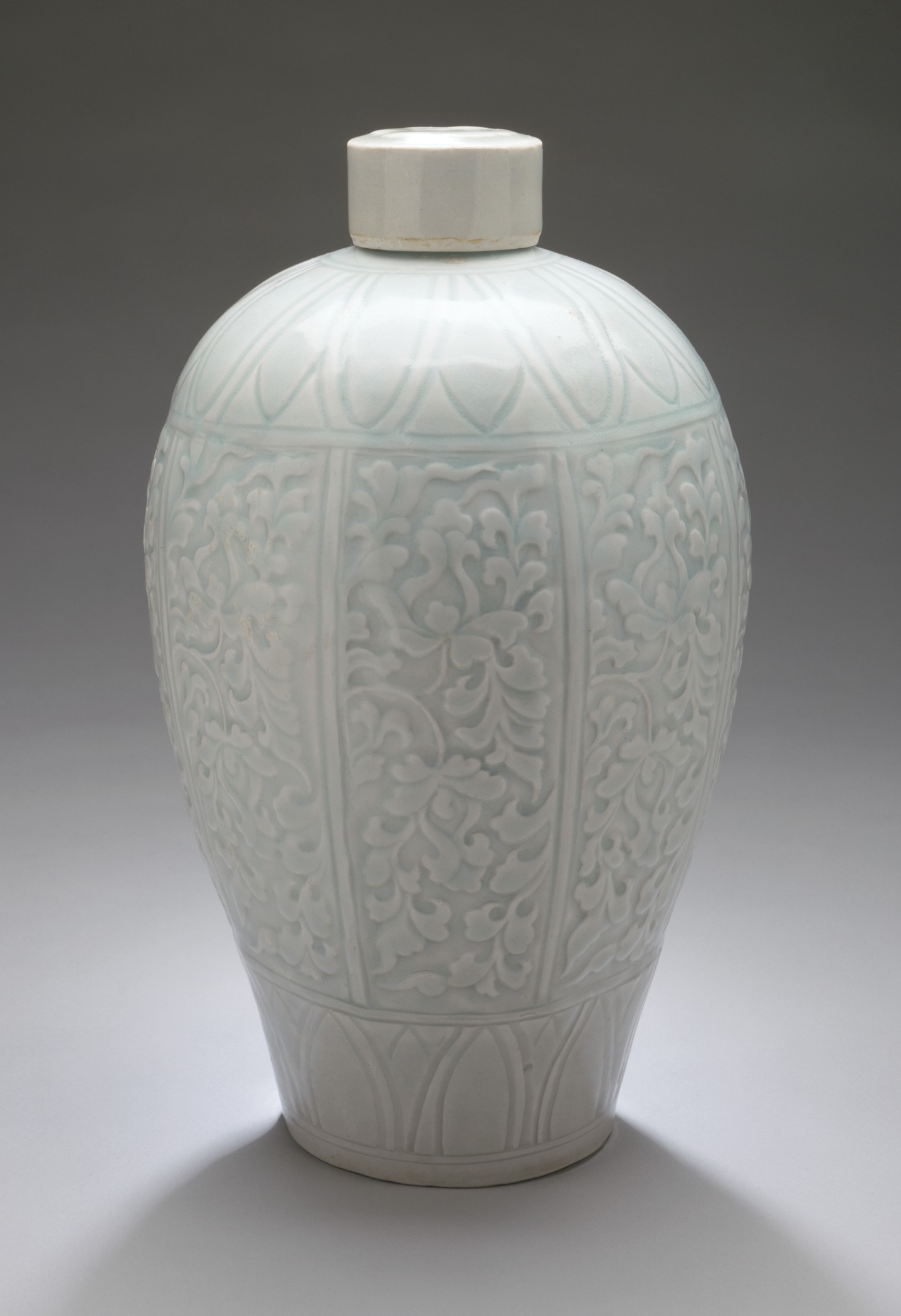
Lidded plum vase (meiping) with lotus sprays, Qingbai ware, Southern Song period. Typically, the glaze has collected in the carved indentations, where the colour is stronger.

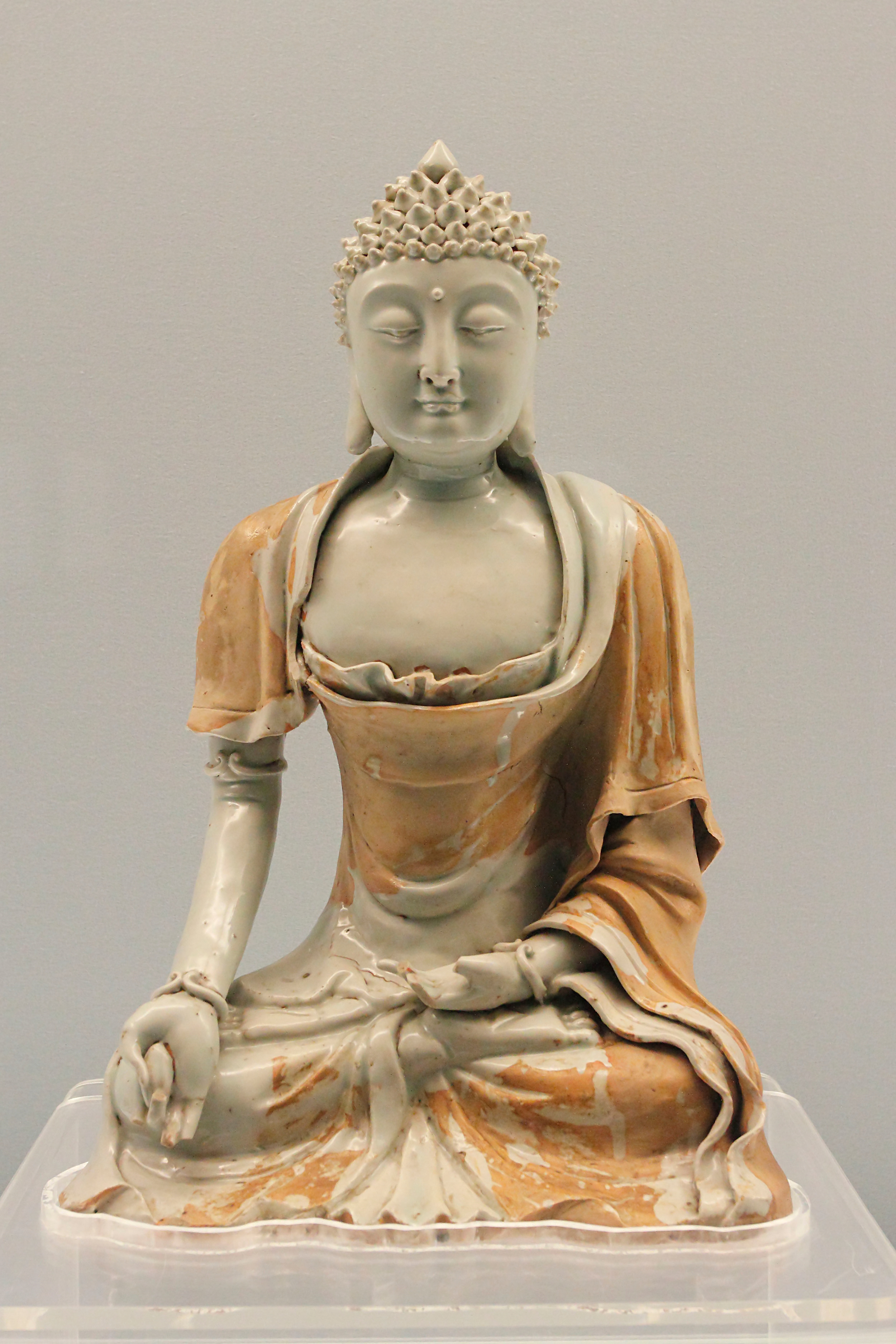
Buddha statue, Jingdezhen, 1271–1368

Qingbai ware (Chinese: 青白; pinyin: qīngbái; lit. 'green-white') is a type of Chinese porcelain produced under the Song dynasty and Yuan dynasty, defined by the ceramic glaze used. Qingbai ware is white with a blue-greenish tint, and is also referred to as Yingqing ("shadow green", although this name appears only to date from the 18th century). It was made in Jiangxi province in south-eastern China, in several locations including Jingdezhen, and is arguably the first type of porcelain to be produced on a very large scale. However, it was not at the time a prestigious ware, and was mostly used for burial wares and exports, or a middle-rank Chinese market. The quality is very variable, reflecting these different markets; the best pieces can be very thin-walled.

Qingbai ware was made with a white porcelain body, fired with a glaze that produced a slight blue-green tint. The kilns used pine wood as fuel, producing a reducing atmosphere that produced the tint. Qingbai ware was used by commoners, and never seems to have been made for imperial use; its quality only came to be appreciated by collectors several centuries later. In the 14th century the same manufacturers turned to the new blue and white porcelain, using the same body, which saw the end of Qingbai ware.

Many types of items were made: as well as the usual plates and bowls, there were teapots and small round lidded boxes, usually described as for cosmetics. Items made for burial included tall funerary urns with complicated, and rather crowded, sets of figures. There are also tomb figures, though less care is expended on these than on the famous sancai figures of the Tang dynasty. Small Buddha statues, often with highly detailed hair, clothes and accessories, come from late in the period.

A variety of forming techniques were used, tending for basic shapes to move over the period from wheel-thrown vessels decorated by carving with a knife (incised) or impressed decoration, to moulded bodies. Shapes and decoration had much in common with Ding ware from northern China; indeed the Jingdezhen white wares preceding Qingbai are known as "Southern Ding".

== History ==
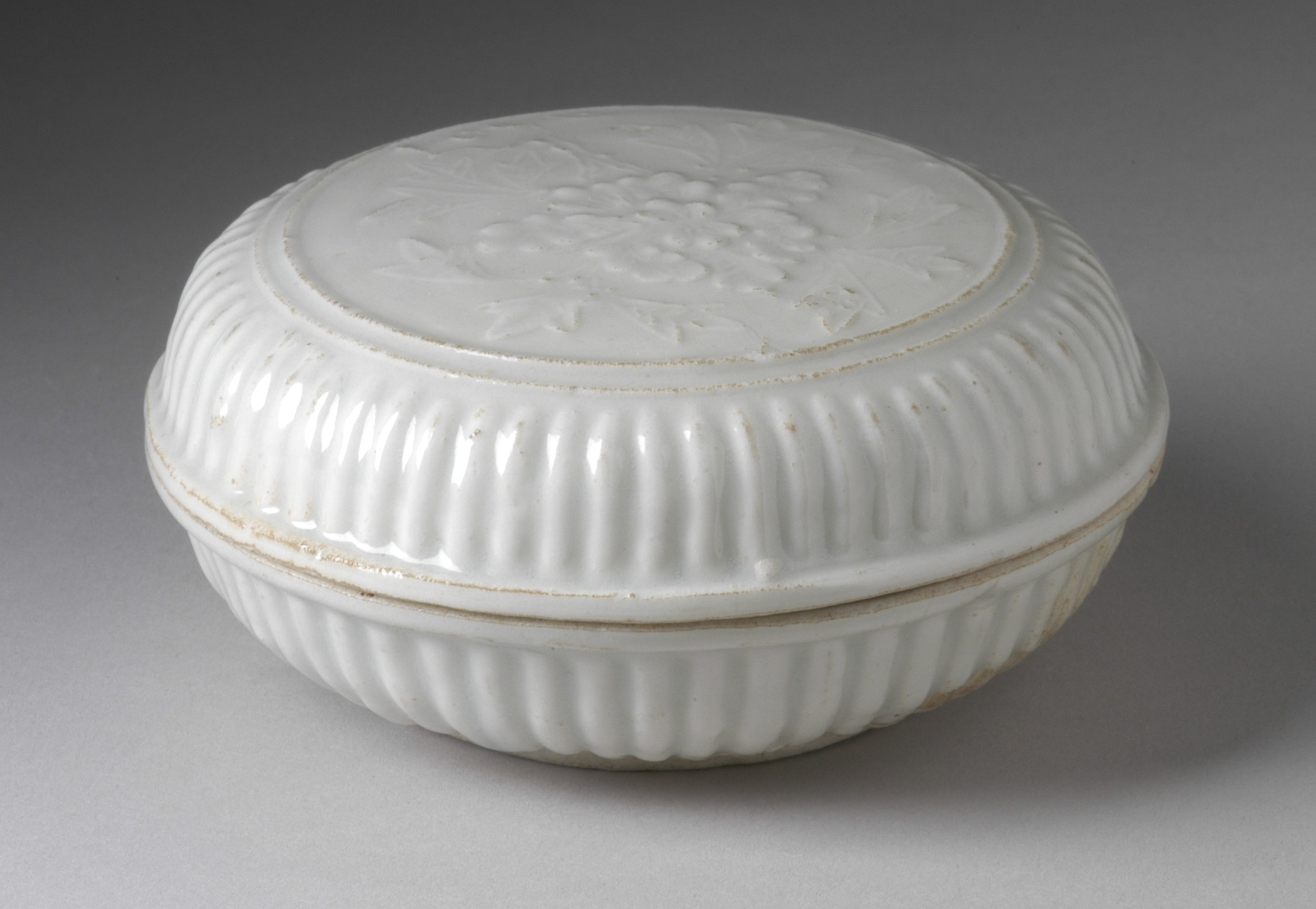
Lidded box (he) with floral spray, Yuan dynasty, 13th–14th century

Qingbai initially appeared in the Northern Song period, from about 960 to 1127, and became a sought-after item in the Chinese market. It became even more popular during the Southern Song period, which lasted approximately from 1127 to 1279. It was also exported in quantity to China's neighboring nations.

Kilns used to make Qingbai ware have been unearthed in many of China's provinces, suggesting great popularity and widespread efforts to duplicate Qingbai throughout the realm. Excavations at the kiln site for Jizhou ware revealed large numbers of discarded fragments of Qingbai, below the layers with brown and white painted wares. Jizhou was clearly one of the secondary sites where this was produced.

A significant individual piece of Qingbai ware is the Fonthill Vase, which reached Europe in 1338, soon after it was made, and is the earliest Chinese ceramic surviving in Europe since medieval times. It was apparently a gift to Louis the Great of Hungary, who seems to have received it from a Chinese embassy on its way to visiting Pope Benedict XII in 1338. The vase was then mounted with a silver handle and base, transforming it into a ewer and transferred as a gift to his Angevin kinsman Charles III of Naples in 1381. It is now, having lost its medieval mounts, in the National Museum of Ireland.

Qingbai was later also produced in Japan, where it is known as seihakuji.

A record auction price was paid for a statue of a seated Guanyin, which raised HKD 25,300,000 (US$3,267,338) at Christie's in Hong Kong in 2011.

== Characteristics ==
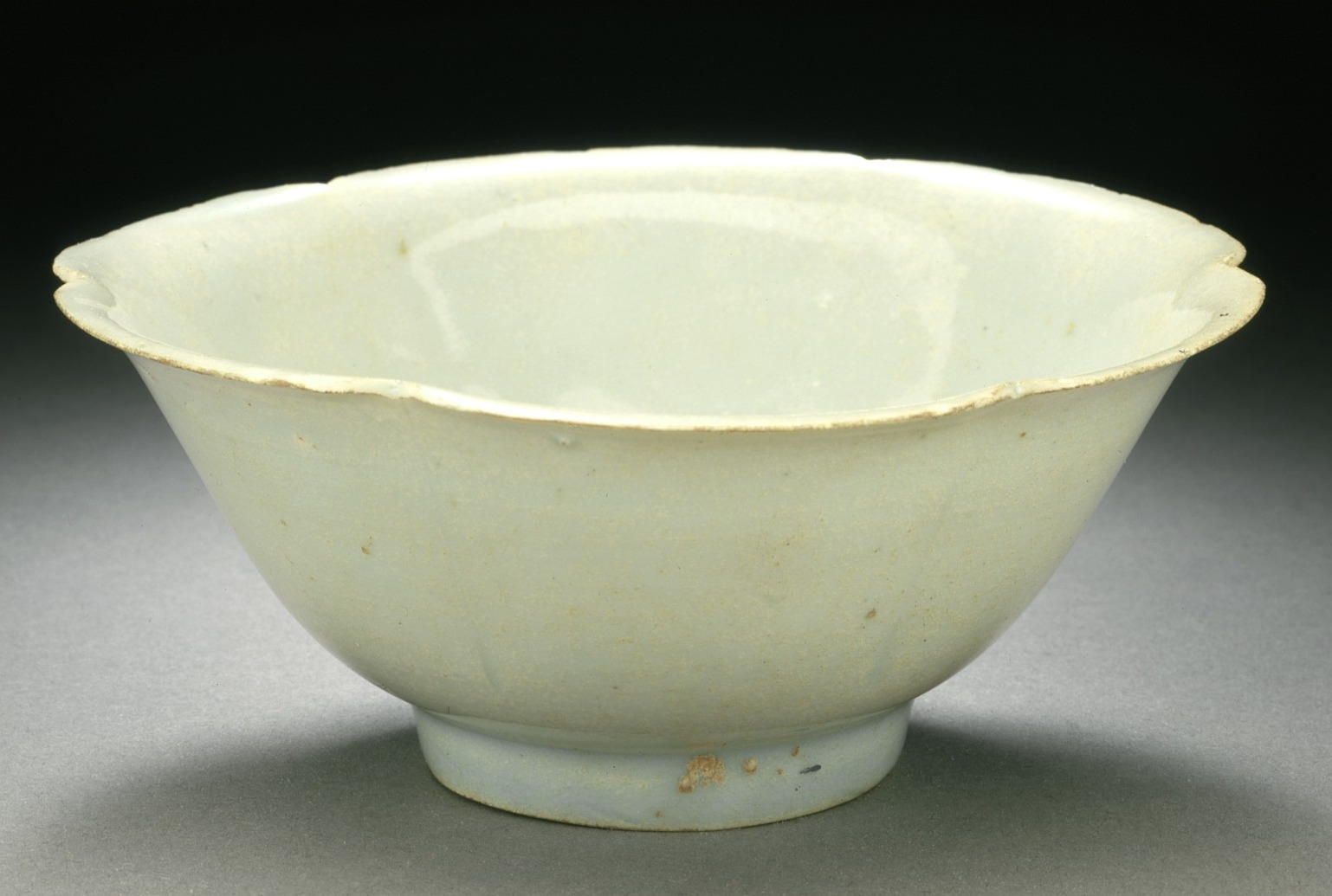
Bowl (Wan) in the Form of a Plum Blossom, late Northern Song or early Southern Song, about 1100–1200

Qingbai ware is not considered to be part of the wu wei ce, Five Great Kilns, or five classic wares of the Song dynasty. These include Ding ware, an off-white porcelain; Qingbai ware is Ding ware that has achieved true translucency, and has a pure white porcelain body with a bluish-green glaze. Makers of Qingbai ware achieved this translucency by using a fine-grained porcelain stone that naturally contained kaolin, and that supported thin-walled vessels. Kaolin, one of the most common clay minerals, gives the porcelain the true white color and allows for minimal shrinking of the vessel, but seems not to have been added, at least at Jingdezhen in the earlier wares. Qingbai ware reached its peak from the 10th through 13th centuries, centered in the southeastern province of Jiangxi and the town of Jingdezhen, but continued into the mid-14th century.

In addition to the advances in chemistry that allowed the creation of thin-walled vessels, Qingbai is distinguished by its smooth, glassy glaze, achieved by using a small amount of iron in a reduction fired kiln. The result is the characteristic blue-green tinted finish. Many of the motifs used in the decoration borrowed from textiles. Qingbai ware also borrowed and improved on decoration from the Ding and Yaozhou wares. Minute detail and beading accent the outside rims of many vessels, especially towards the end of the production. In the early 14th century the Jingdezhen potters created a sturdier ceramic body by adding more kaolin to the clay. This type of ceramic ware is referred to as luanbai (eggshell white) because of its opaque glaze. Luanbai ware was short lived but helped to establish a precedent for new mixtures of clay.

== Images ==
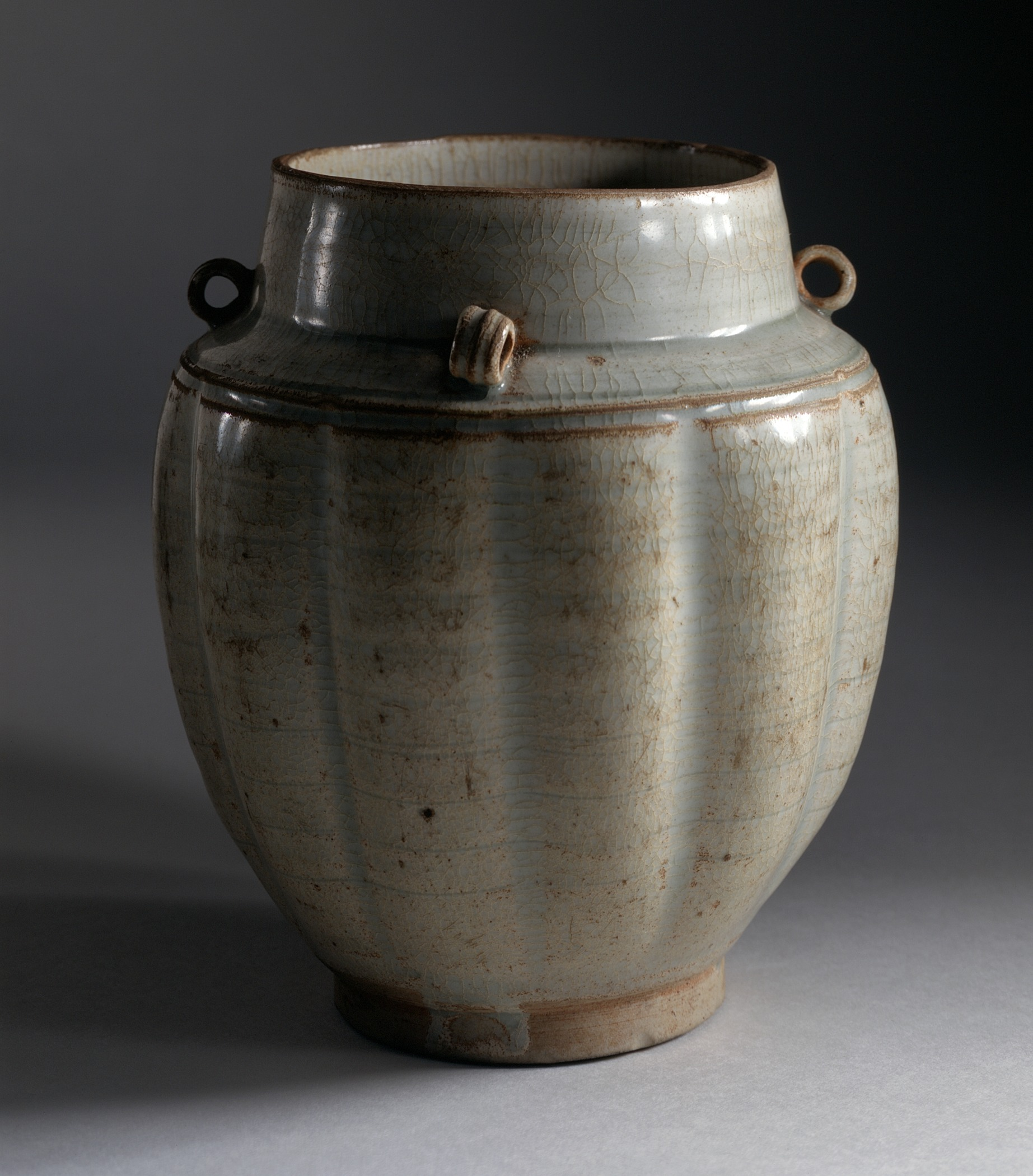
Fluted jar (quan) with loops on shoulder, Northern Song dynasty, 960–1127, the brown from added iron oxides

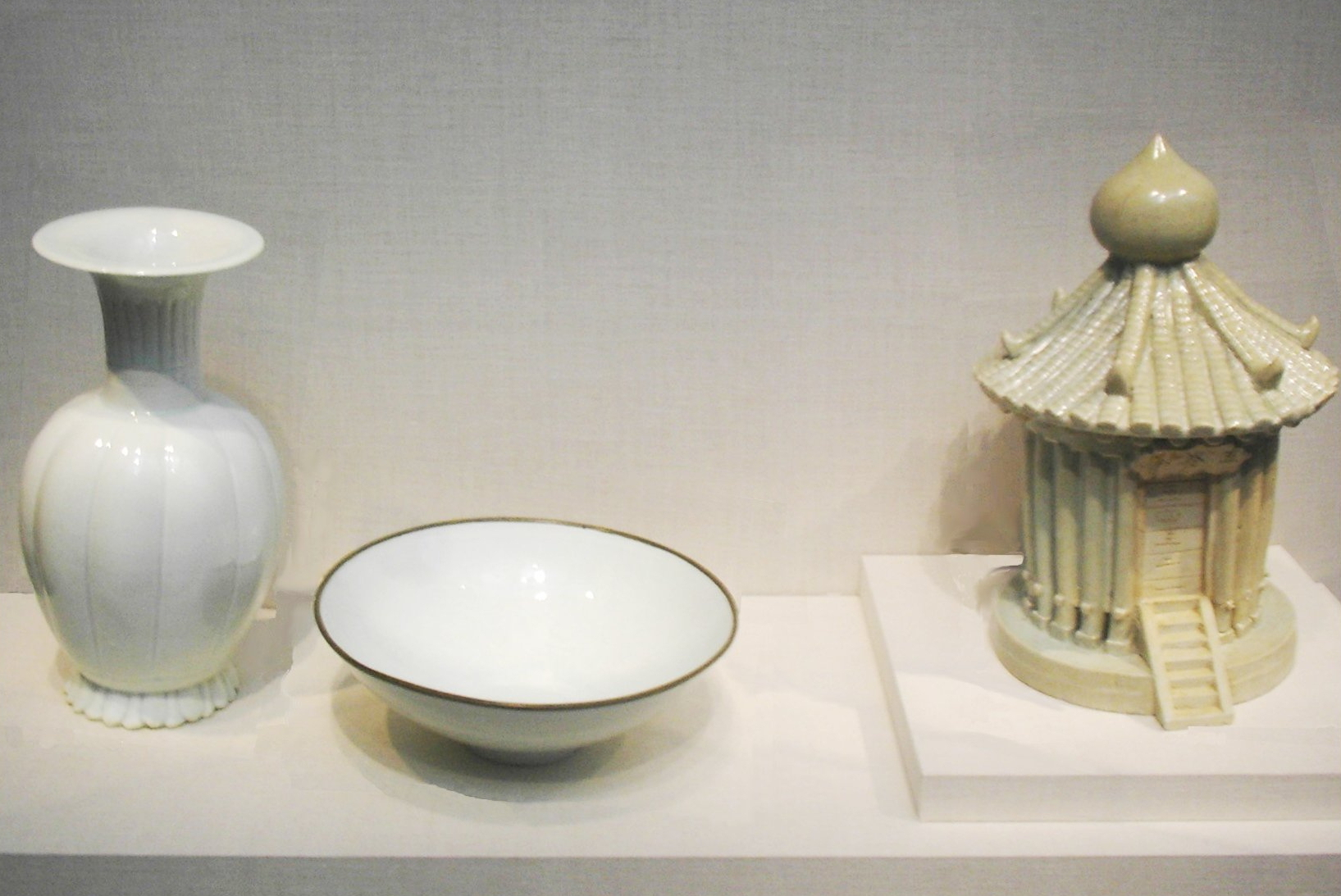
Pieces of (l to r) the 11th, 12th–13th, 13th centuries, on the right a model grain store

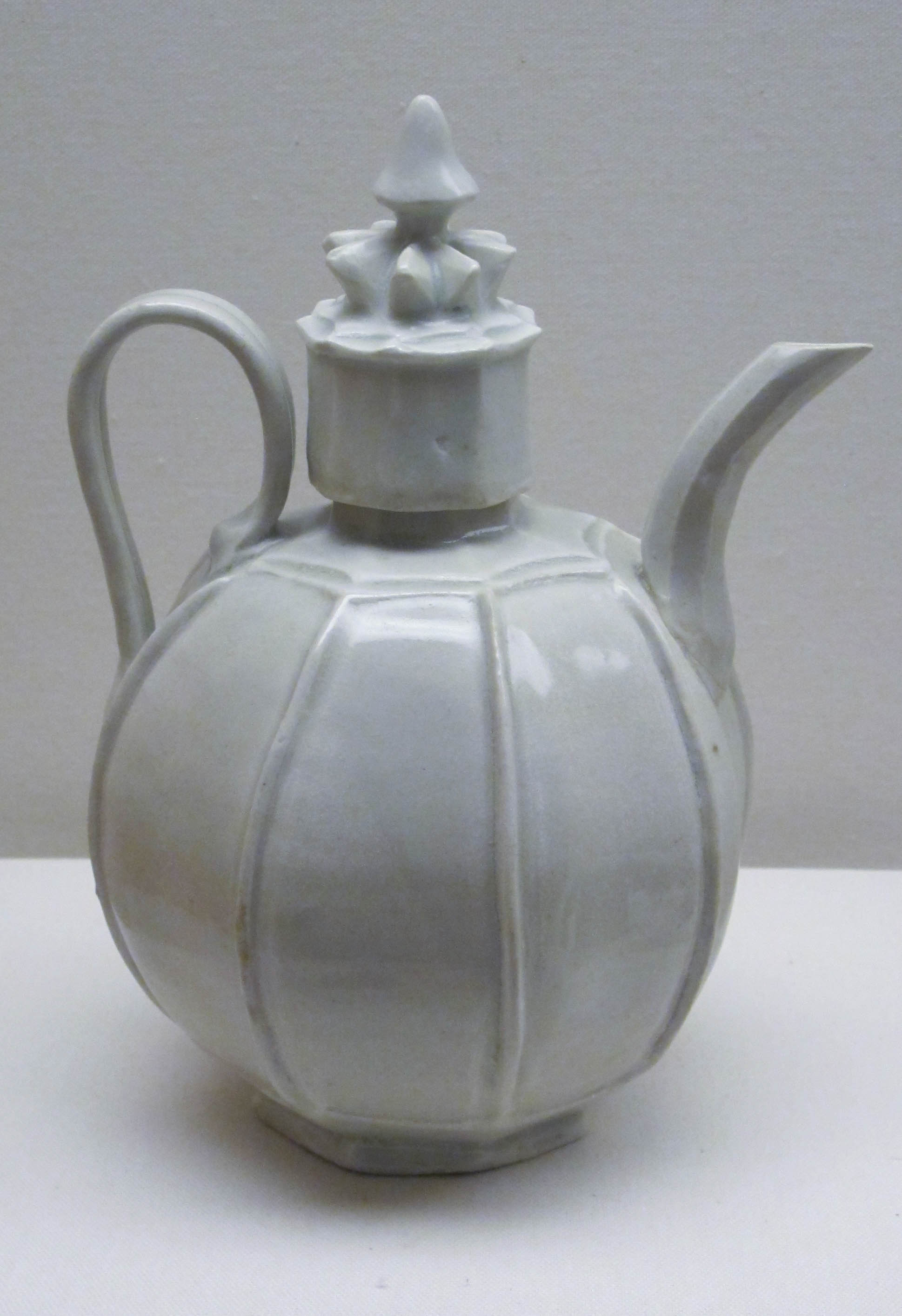
Ewer with cover, Song

Song meiping vase with carved floral spray

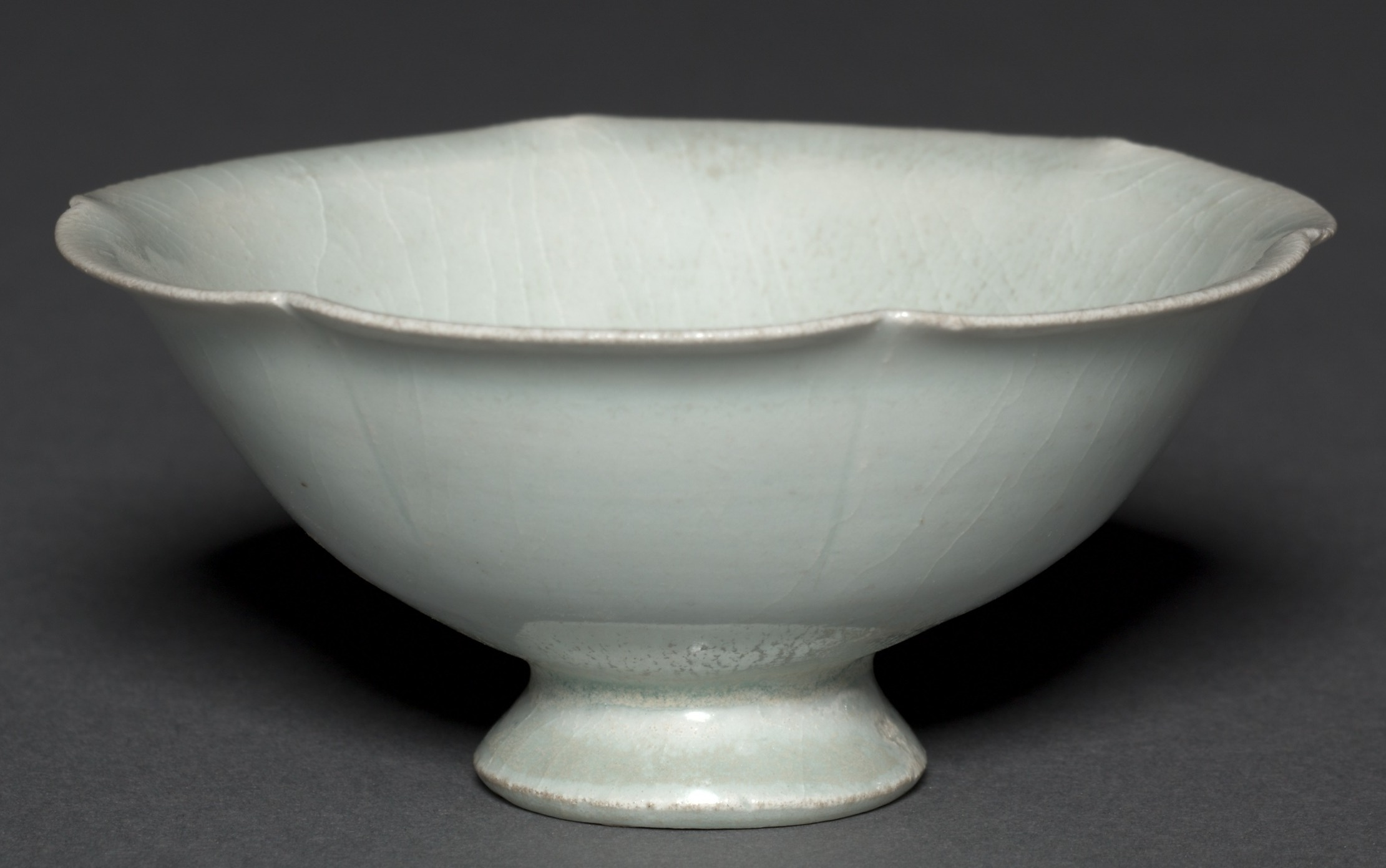
Southern Song cup

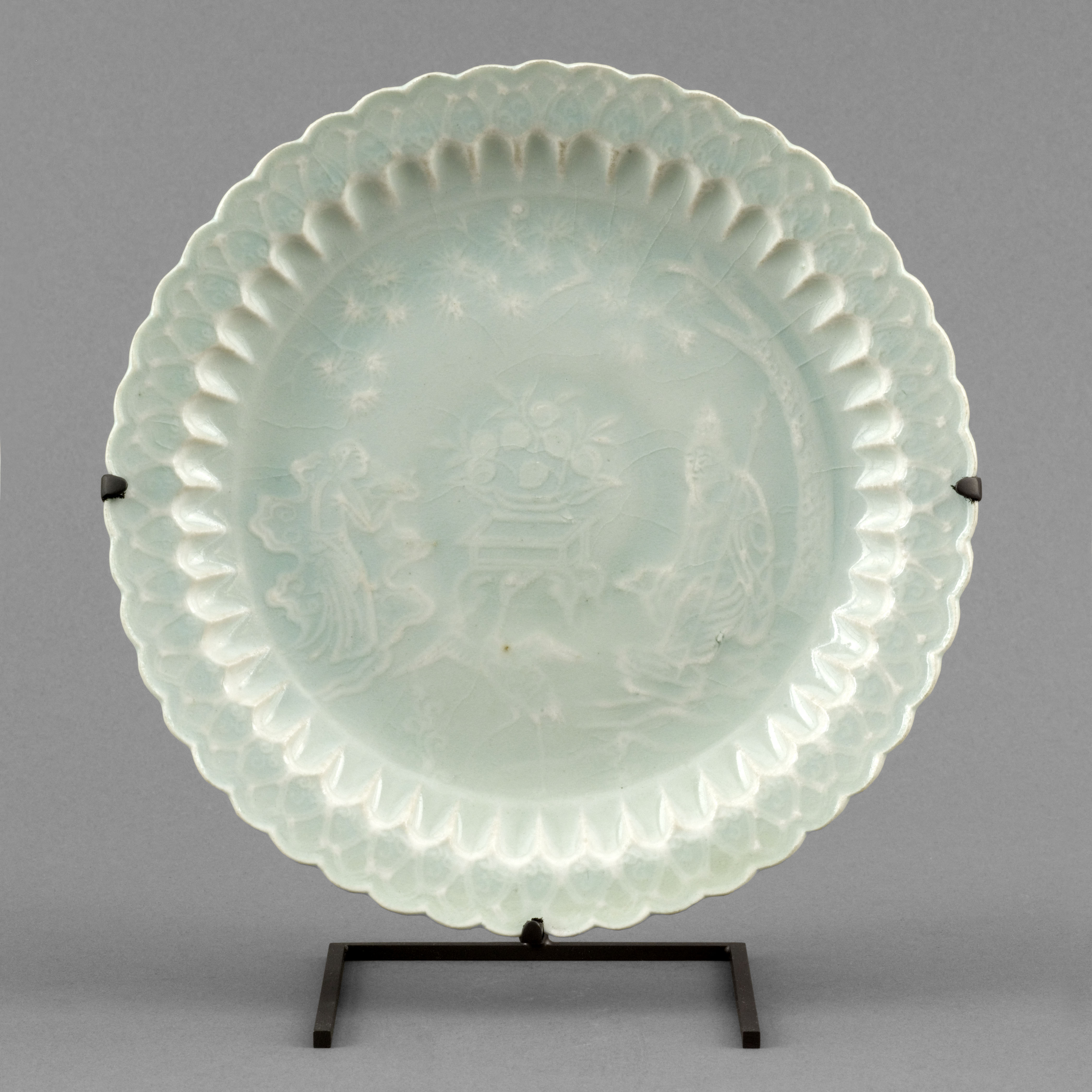
Platter. Jingdezhen, Southern Song, 1127–1279. Musée Cernuschi

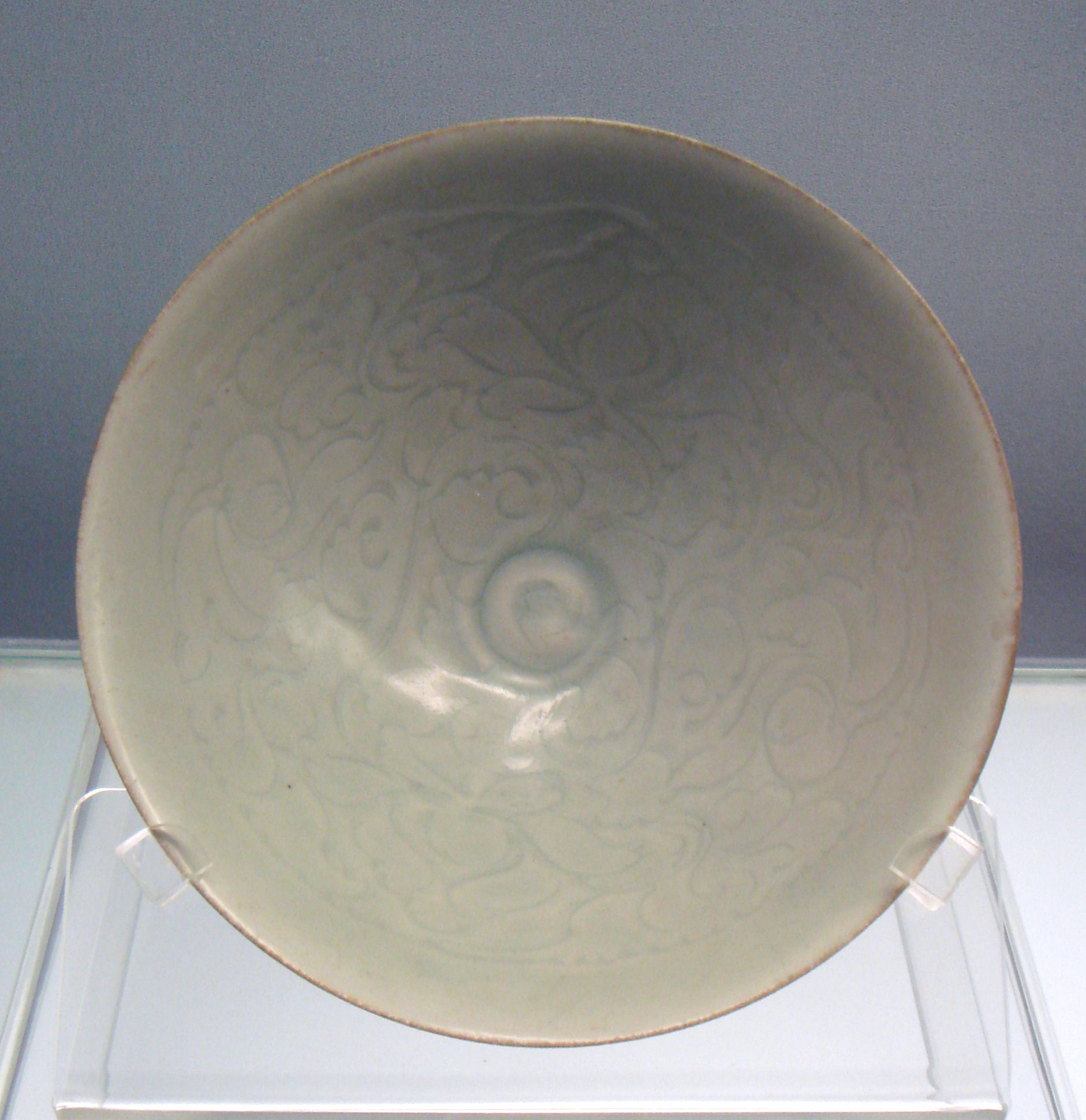
Bowl with carved peony design, Jingdezhen ware, Southern Song, 1127–1279

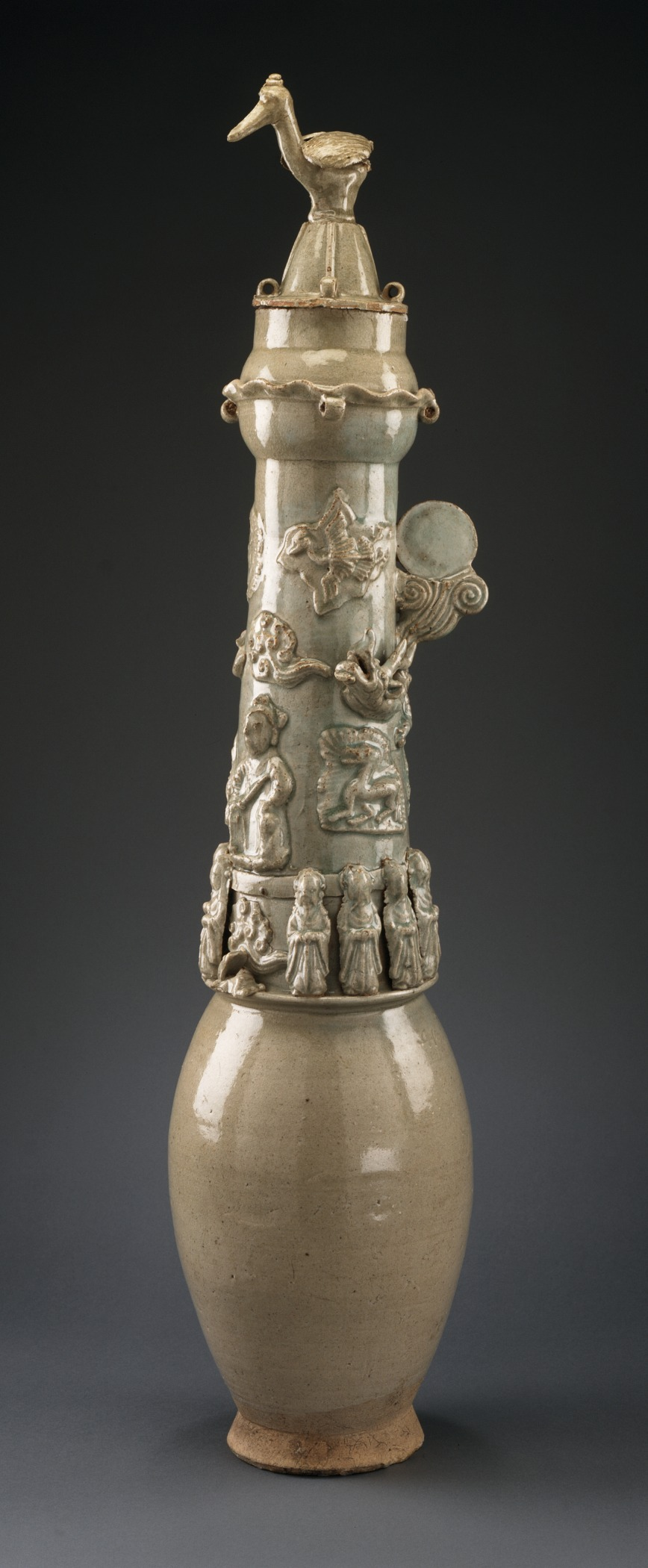
Lidded funerary urn (ping) with crane and dragon, late Southern Song dynasty, about 1200–1279

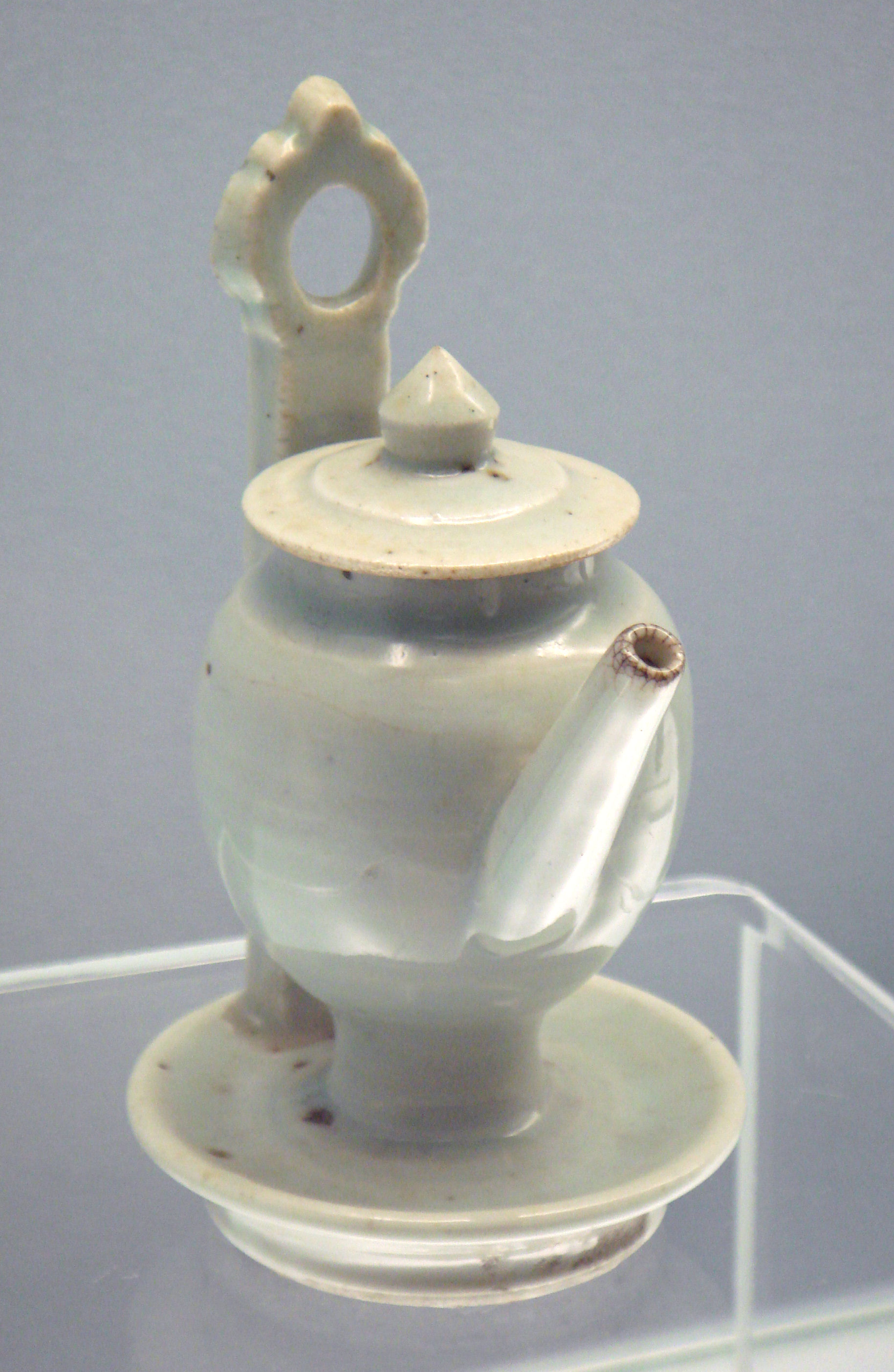
Qingbai glazed lamp, Jingdezhen, Yuan, 1271–1368

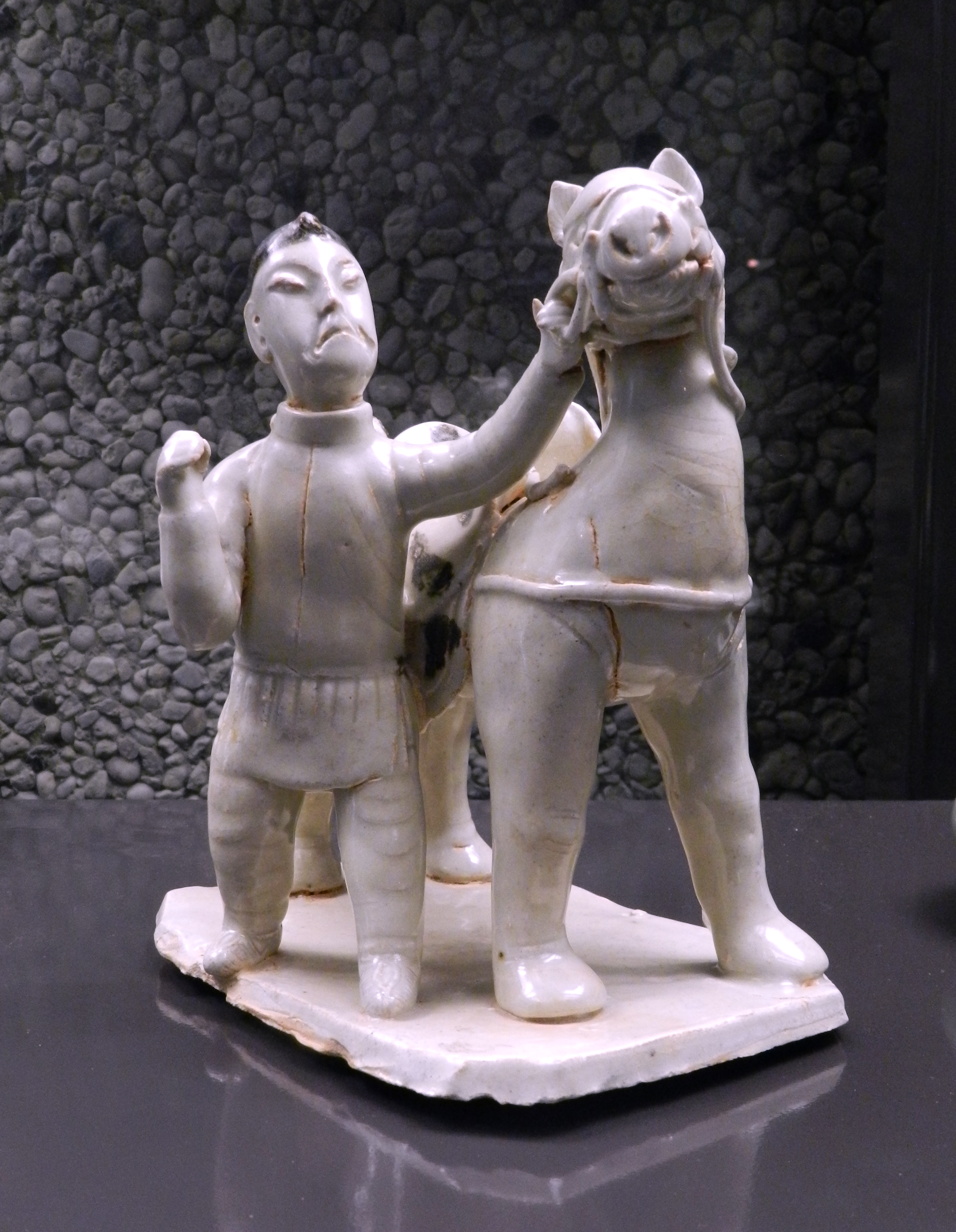
Horse and groom, tomb figures, Yuan dynasty

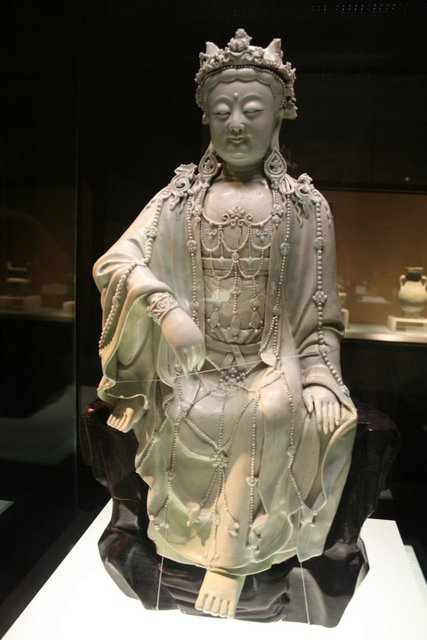
Statue of Guanyin, Yuan dynasty

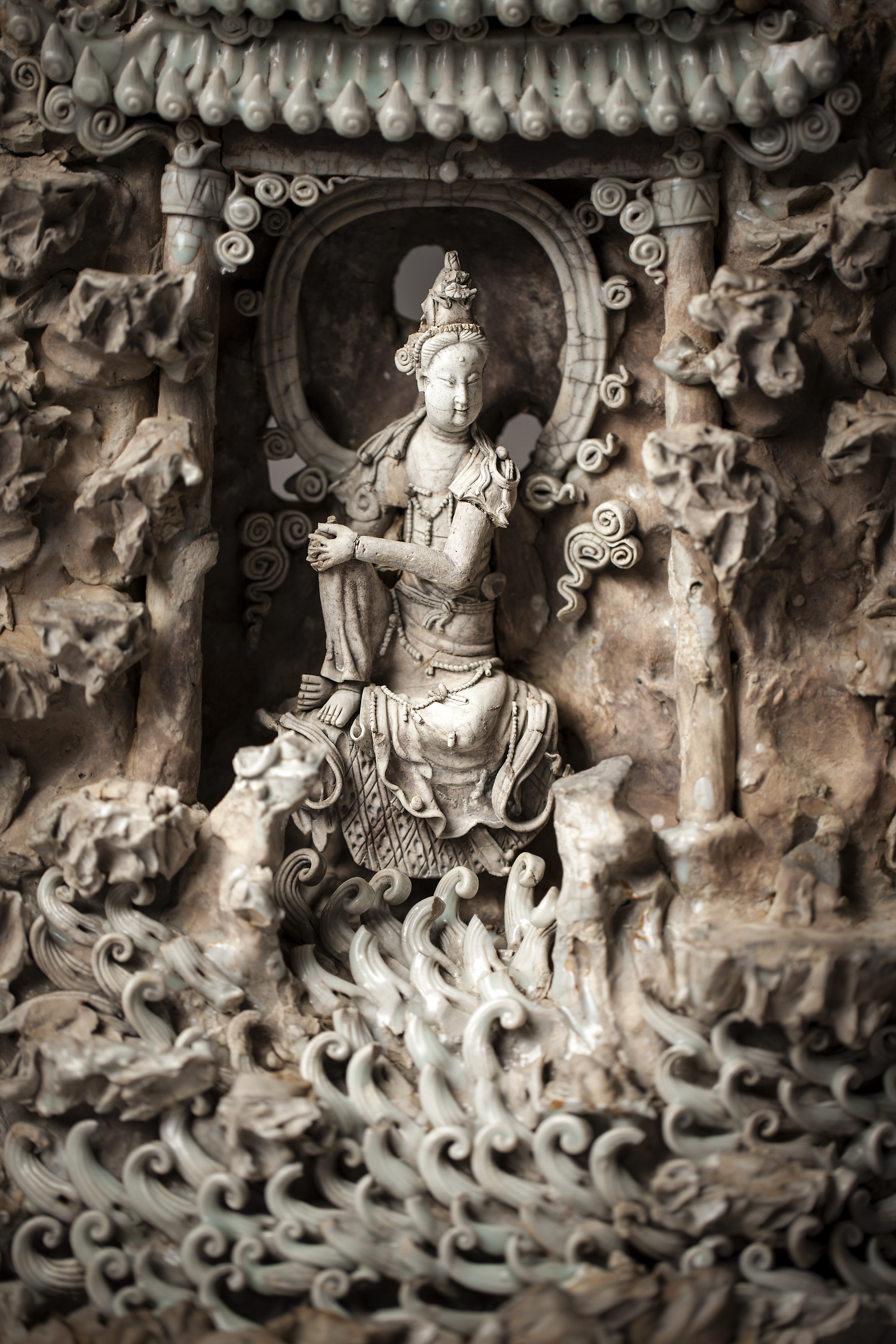
Detail of elaborate part-glazed shrine, nearly 30 cm tall, 1280–1330

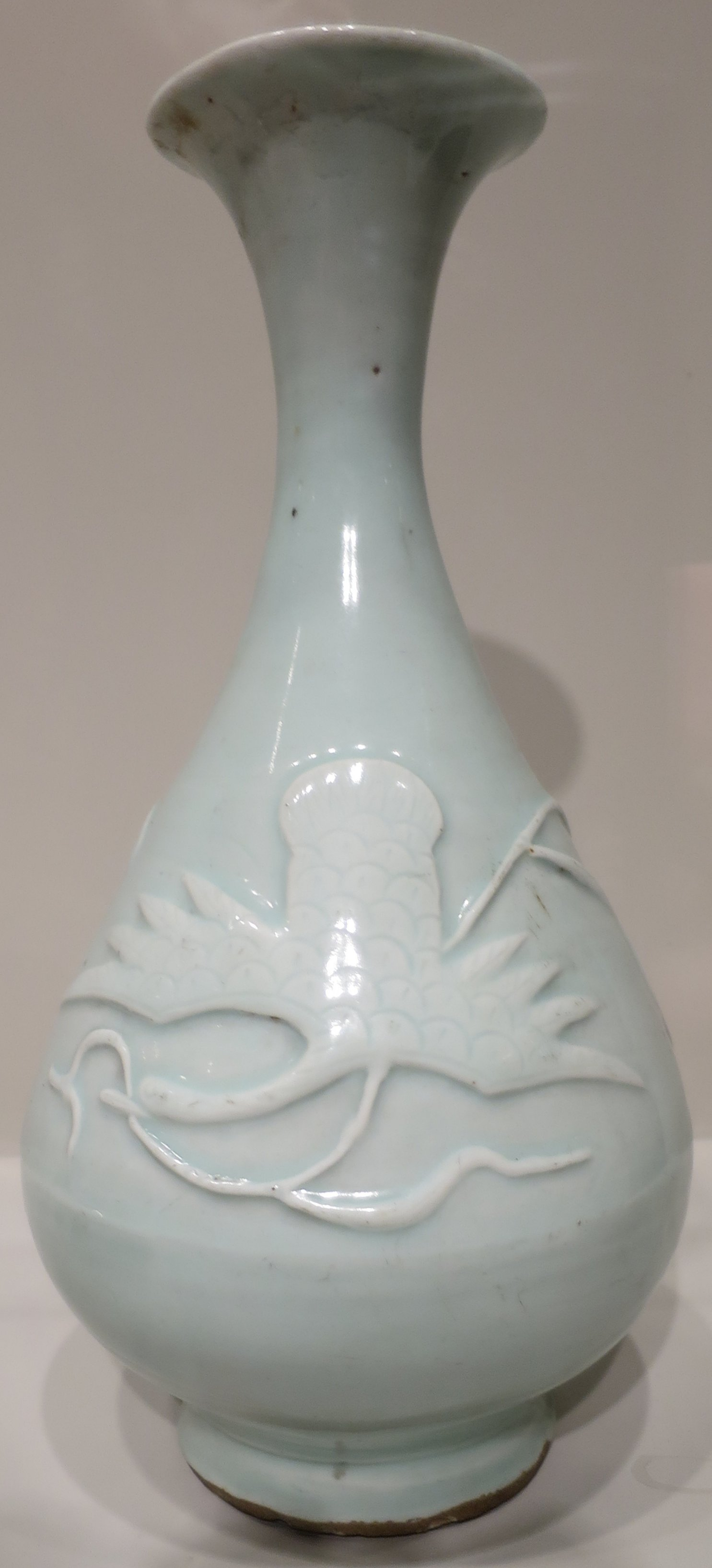
Yuan dynasty vase, 13th–14th century

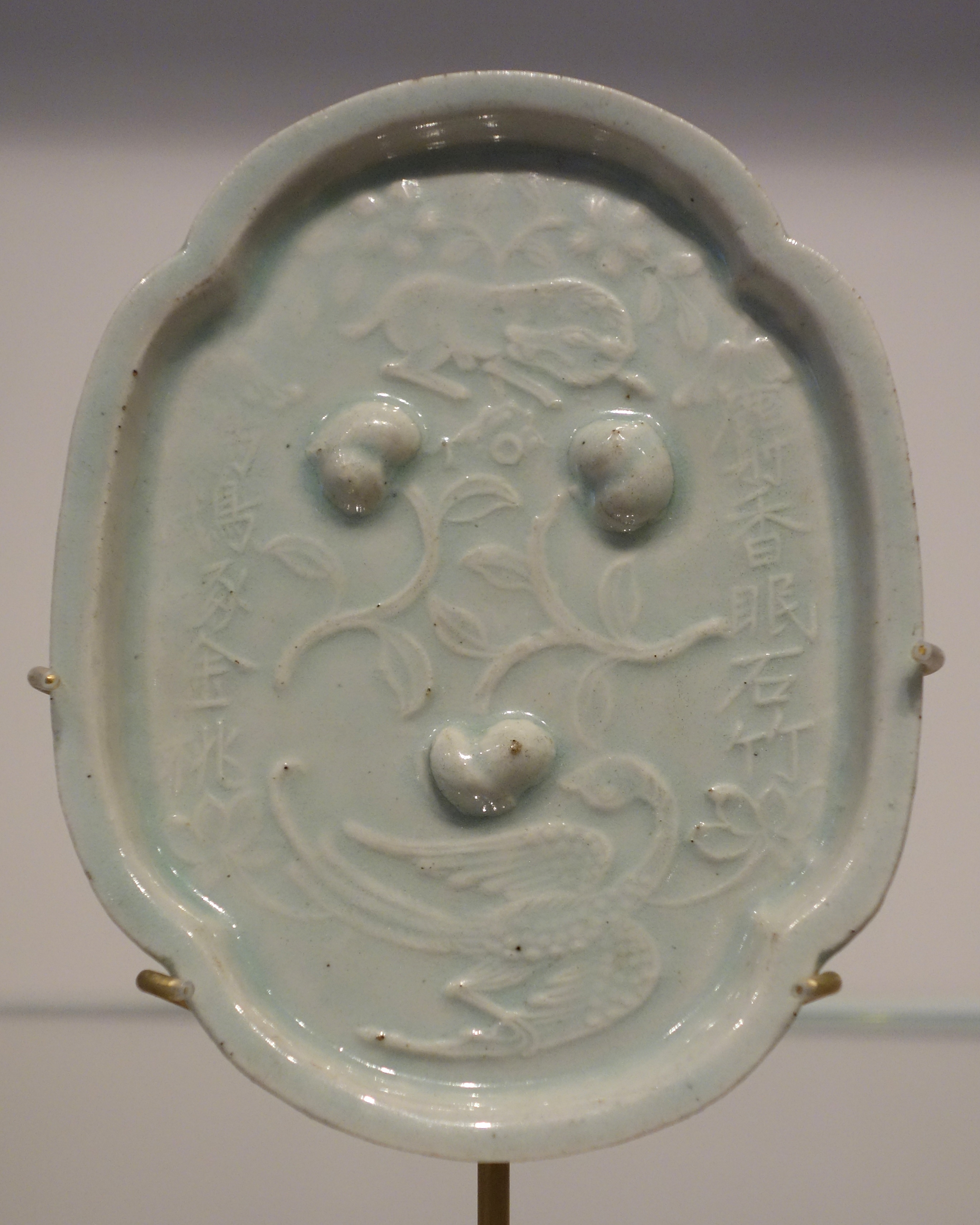
Jingdezhen dish with moulded decoration, Yuan dynasty, c. 1300–1368

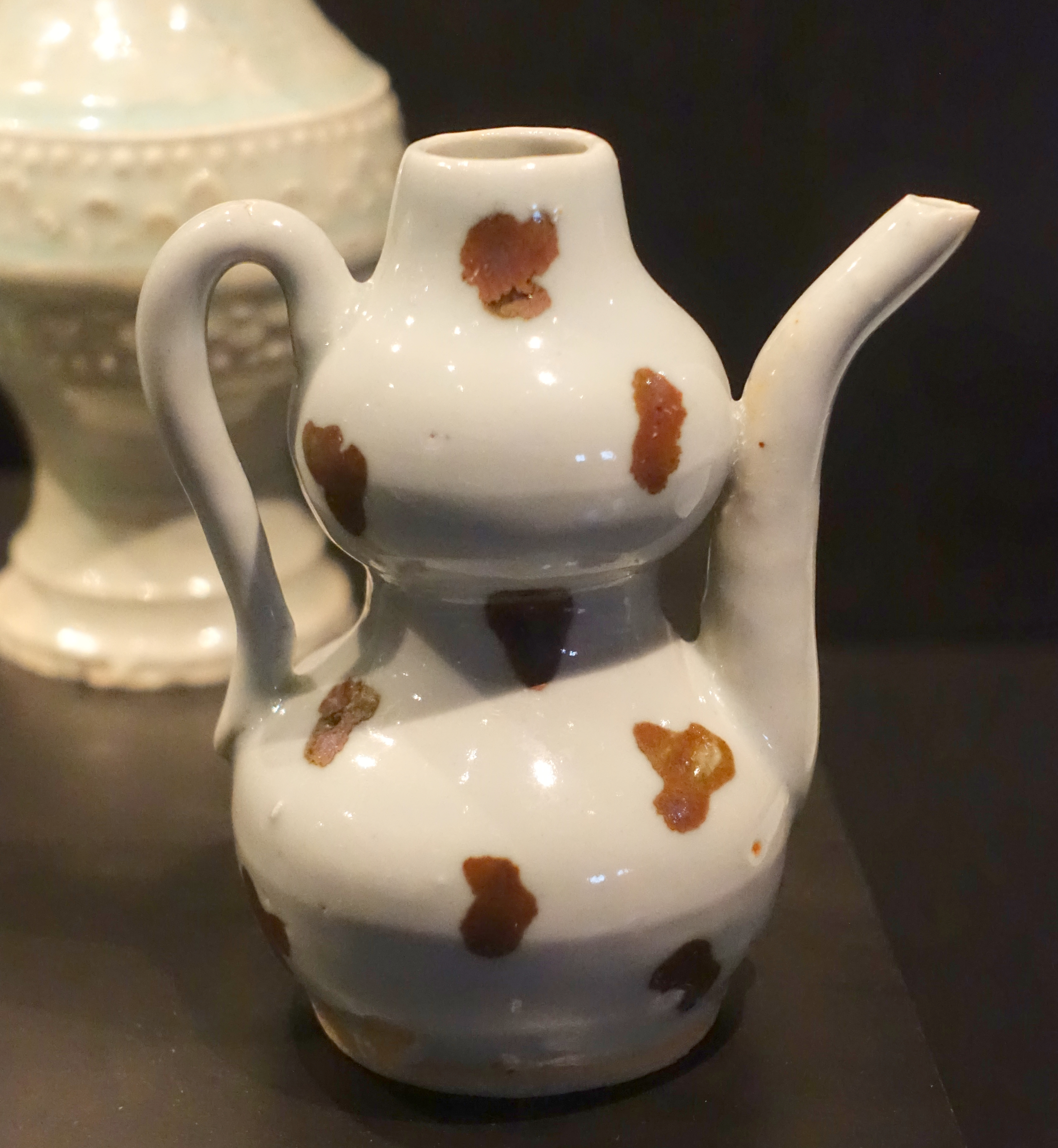
Gourd-shaped jug with iron-brown spots, Yuan dynasty, 1279–1368
