= Gangjin-eup =

- Panoramic view of Gangjin-eup

- Location of Gangjin-eup in South Korea
- Coordinates: 34°37′28″N 126°45′55″E
- Country: South Korea
- Province: South Jeolla
- County: Gangjin
- Administrative divisions: 15 ri

Area
  - Total: 50.91 km^{2} (19.66 sq mi)
- Elevation: 4.9 m (16 ft)

Population
  - Total: 15,936
  - Density: 313/km^{2} (810/sq mi)
- Time zone: UTC+9 (Korea Standard Time)

Korean name
- Hangul: 강진읍
- Hanja: 康津邑
- RR: Gangjin-eup
- MR: Kangjin-ŭp

Gangjin-eup (Korean: 강진읍) is an administrative division of Gangjin county, South Jeolla Province, South Korea. As with much of Gangjin county, Gangjin-eup is largely agricultural and known for its rice, tomato, and persimmon harvests.

It is the county seat, with a population of roughly 16,600 people, comprising roughly 6,000 families. There are 4 elementary schools, 2 middle schools, and several high schools.

Gangjin county is known as a center for the production of Goryeo celadon, traditional Korean pottery. Gangjin county is also home to several temples, and Gangjin-eup itself holds the birthplace of Yeongrang Kim Yun-sik, a well-known Korean poet of the 1930s and 1940s.

There is a monument to 17th-century Dutch explorer Hendrick Hamel, the first westerner to experience and write about Korea's Joseon Dynasty era. Hamel and his men were shipwrecked on Jeju island, and they remained captives in Korea for 13 years. Now this city in Korea is sister cities with Snoqualmie, Washington, U.S.A.

== Places of interest ==
- Boeunsan, 439 metres (1,440 ft)
- Geumgoksa
