= Kiln Site in Yucheon-ri, Buan =

Goryeo-era kilns in Buan, South Korea

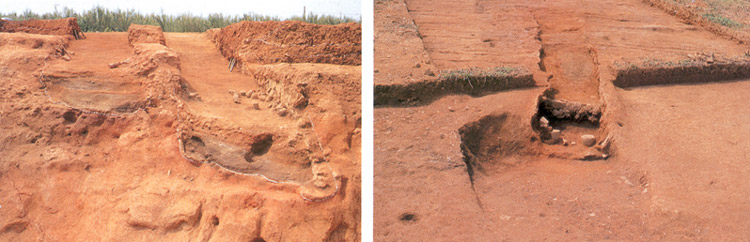
- Photos of the site
- Interactive map of Kiln Site in Yucheon-ri, Buan
- 35°36′50″N 126°39′55″E
- Location: Buan County, North Jeolla Province, South Korea

History
- Built: 11th to 14th centuries

Historic Sites of South Korea
- Designated: 1963-01-21
- Reference no.: 69

The Kiln Site in Yucheon-ri, Buan (Korean: 부안 유천리 요지; Hanja: 扶安柳川里窯址) refers to a Goryeo-era archaeological site in Yucheon-ri, Buan County, North Jeolla Province, South Korea. In the site are the remains of 40 kilns used to produce Goryeo ware. On January 21, 1963, the site was made a Historic Site of South Korea.

There are two known major groups of earthenware and celadon kiln sites from the Goryeo period: those in Gangjin County and more in Buan County. Across these two areas, around 400 kiln sites have been discovered.

The Yucheon-ri kilns date to the 11th to 14th centuries. Numerous pieces of celadon pottery and ceramics have been recovered from the site.

== See also ==
- Kiln Site in Jinseo-ri, Buan
