= Haegang Ceramics Museum =

Coordinates: 37.30876°N 127.40491°E

The Haegang Ceramics Museum (해강도자미술관) is Korea's first museum dedicated to ceramics and is located in Icheon, Gyeonggi Province. The museum is devoted to researching and exhibiting Korean ceramics, including celadon ware, punch’ong ware and white porcelain.

The museum was founded by Yu Geun-Hyeong, pen name Haegang, and his sons in 1990. Geun-Hyeon was a master Korean ceramist that played a leading role in the revival of Goryeo celadon in the early 20th century, and spent his life collecting ceramics and researching ancient ceramic production techniques.

The first floor of the museum is devoted to the history of ceramic art in Korea, where historical documents and visual aids demonstrate the techniques used to create Korean porcelain.

The second floor features a permanent exhibition of ceramics dating back to the 9th century. Geun-Hyeon's masterpieces are also on display.

The museum also offers workshops for visitors and special exhibitions throughout the year.

== See also ==
- Korean pottery and porcelain
- Goryeo Celadon Museum in Sadang-ri (Sadang Village), Gangjin County
