= Jujaksan =

Mountain in South Korea

Highest point
- Elevation: 475 m (1,558 ft)
- Coordinates: 34.5055°N 126.6933°E

Geography
- Location: South Jeolla Province, South Korea

Jujaksan (Korean: 주작산; Hanja: 朱雀山; lit. 'Vermilion Bird mountain') is a mountain of South Jeolla Province, South Korea. It has an elevation of 475 metres. It is part of a range that runs from Gangjin County.

The mountain is named for the Vermilion Bird, a red phoenix deity, which it is said to resemble when viewed from a distance. The highest peak is said to be the bird's head, turned to the west. It is popular as a tourist attraction for its azalea flower blooms from April to May. These flowers are cared for by Gangjin County. There are a number of hiking trails, ranging from 3 hours to 6 hours, and a parking lot for visitors. Hikes on it are said to be challenging, with steep surfaces and sharp rocks. Bouldering has been practiced on the mountain. A forest on the mountain (주작산 자연휴양림) has 45 guestrooms and 16 campsites. The county has invested in such facilities, as well as hiking trails and flowers, to boost tourism in the area.

The rocks on the mountain are sedimentary, volcanic, and metamorphic rocks, and were formed around the Paleozoic.

== See also ==
- List of mountains of Korea
