= Gangjin Baseball Park =

Baseball stadium in Gangjin, South Korea

Coordinates: 34.55819°N 126.76528°E

- Interactive map of Gangjin Baseball Park
- Location: Doam-myeon, Gangjin-gun, Jeollanam-do, South Korea
- Owner: Gangjin, South Korea
- Operator: Kiwoom Heroes
- Capacity: 250
- Surface: Natural grass
- Field size: Left Field – 90 metres (295 ft); Center – 120 metres (394 ft)

Construction
- Opened: 2009

Tenant
- Nexen Heroes (2010—2013)

Gangjin Baseball Park is a baseball stadium in Gangjin County, South Korea.
