= Kiln Site in Jinseo-ri, Buan =

Goryeo-era kilns in Buan, South Korea

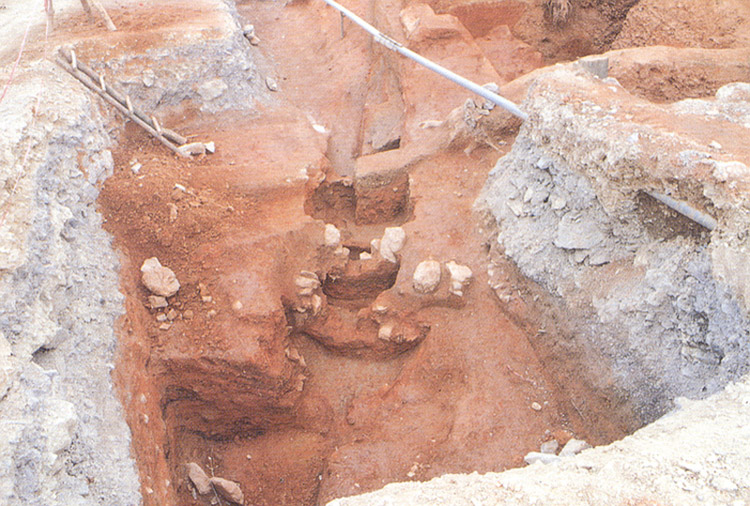
- Part of the site
- Interactive map of Kiln Site in Jinseo-ri, Buan
- 35°36′12″N 126°37′27″E
- Location: Buan County, South Korea

History
- Built: 11th to 13th centuries

Historic Sites of South Korea
- Designated: 1963-01-21

The Kiln Site in Jinseo-ri, Buan (Korean: 부안 진서리 요지; Hanja: 扶安鎭西里窯址) refers to a Goryeo-era archaeological site in Jinseo-ri, Buan County, North Jeolla Province, South Korea. In the site are around 40 kilns used to produce Goryeo ware. On January 21, 1963, the site was made a Historic Site of South Korea.

The kilns date to around the 11th to 13th centuries. The kilns were made by digging a long hole on a slope of a hill, with smoke holes on the upper side.

== See also ==
- Kiln Site in Yucheon-ri, Buan
