= Koryo Celadon =

1979 South Korean short documentary film

- Directed by: Paul Raimondi
- Produced by: Donald A. Connolly; Paul Raimondi
- Production company: Korean Film Unit
- Release date: 1979
- Country: South Korea
- Language: English

Koryo Celadon is a 1979 South Korean short documentary film directed by Paul Raimondi about Goryeo dynasty pottery. It was nominated for an Academy Award for Best Documentary Short. It documents the manufacturing process of celadon vessels by Living National Treasure Yu Geun-Hyeong.
