= Maryang =

Coordinates: 36°08′N 126°30′E

- myeon
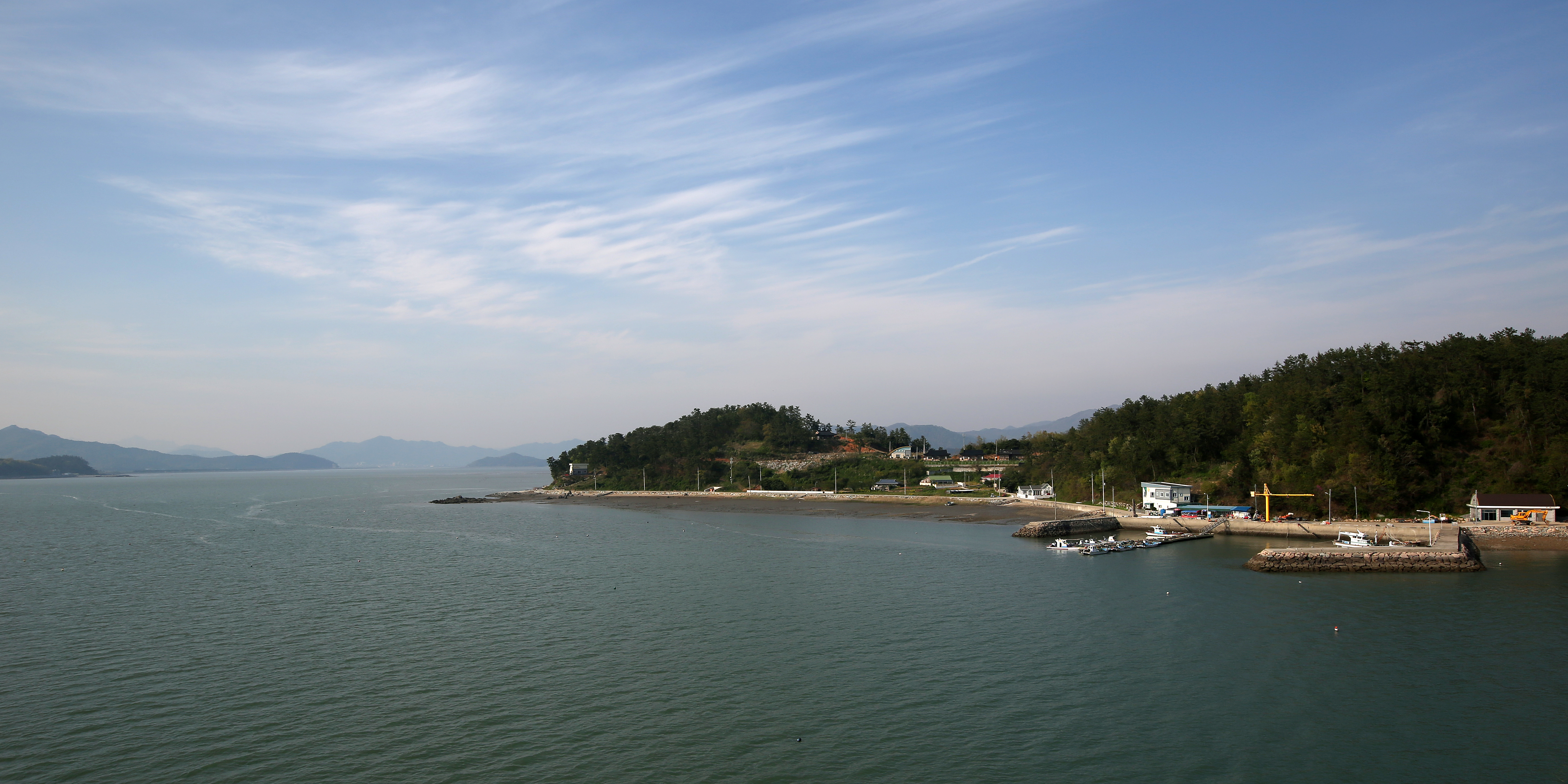
- Gangjinman Bay
- Interactive map of Maryang
- Country: South Korea
- Province: South Jeolla Province

Area
  - Total: 20.16 km^{2} (7.78 sq mi)

Population (2009)
  - Total: 2,202
  - Density: 109.2/km^{2} (282.9/sq mi)

Korean name
- Hangul: 마량면
- Hanja: 馬良面
- RR: Maryang-myeon
- MR: Maryang-myŏn

Maryang is located in Gangjin county, South Jeolla province, South Korea. It is one of ten myeon in Gangjin county, and it is notable for commercial and recreational fishing.

Maryang was designated a myeon on April 1, 1989. At the end of December 2009, its population was 2,202 people in 1,034 households, down from 2,436 people in 1,009 households in 2003.
