= Intaglio =

Intaglio, the process of cutting a design into a surface, may refer to:

- Intaglio, a type of engraved gem or metal signet ring
- Intaglio (printmaking), a group of printmaking techniques, including engraving and etching
- Intaglio (rock art)
- Intaglio (burial mound), a technique for decorating North American burial mounds
  - Blythe Intaglios, large Native American designs on the ground in California
- Intaglio (dentistry), the interior surface of a denture
- Intaglio (conference), an Indian business school conference
- Intaglio: A Novel in Six Stories, a novel by Roberta Fernández

== See also ==
- Relief, the opposite, where the design rises above the background surface
