= Boeunsan =

Mountain in Gangjin, South Korea

Highest point
- Elevation: 439 m (1,440 ft)
- Listing: Mountains of Korea
- Coordinates: 34°39′N 126°46′E

Geography
- Country: South Korea

Korean name
- Hangul: 보은산
- Hanja: 寶恩山
- RR: Boeunsan
- MR: Poŭnsan

Boeunsan (Korean: 보은산) is the name of a mountain in Gangjin county, South Jeolla Province, South Korea. Its highest point is at Udubong (우두봉), 439 metres.

Boeunsan is north of Gangjin-eup in Gangjin county, and runs parallel to National Route 2.

Boeunsan is a popular area for hiking among locals in Gangjin. There are three courses, the longest of which is roughly 6 km. There are three Buddhist temples in the foothills, most notably Geumgoksa. Additionally, there are sporadic springs and exercise areas along the trails.
