= Goryeo Celadon Museum =

Museum located in Gangjin, South Korea

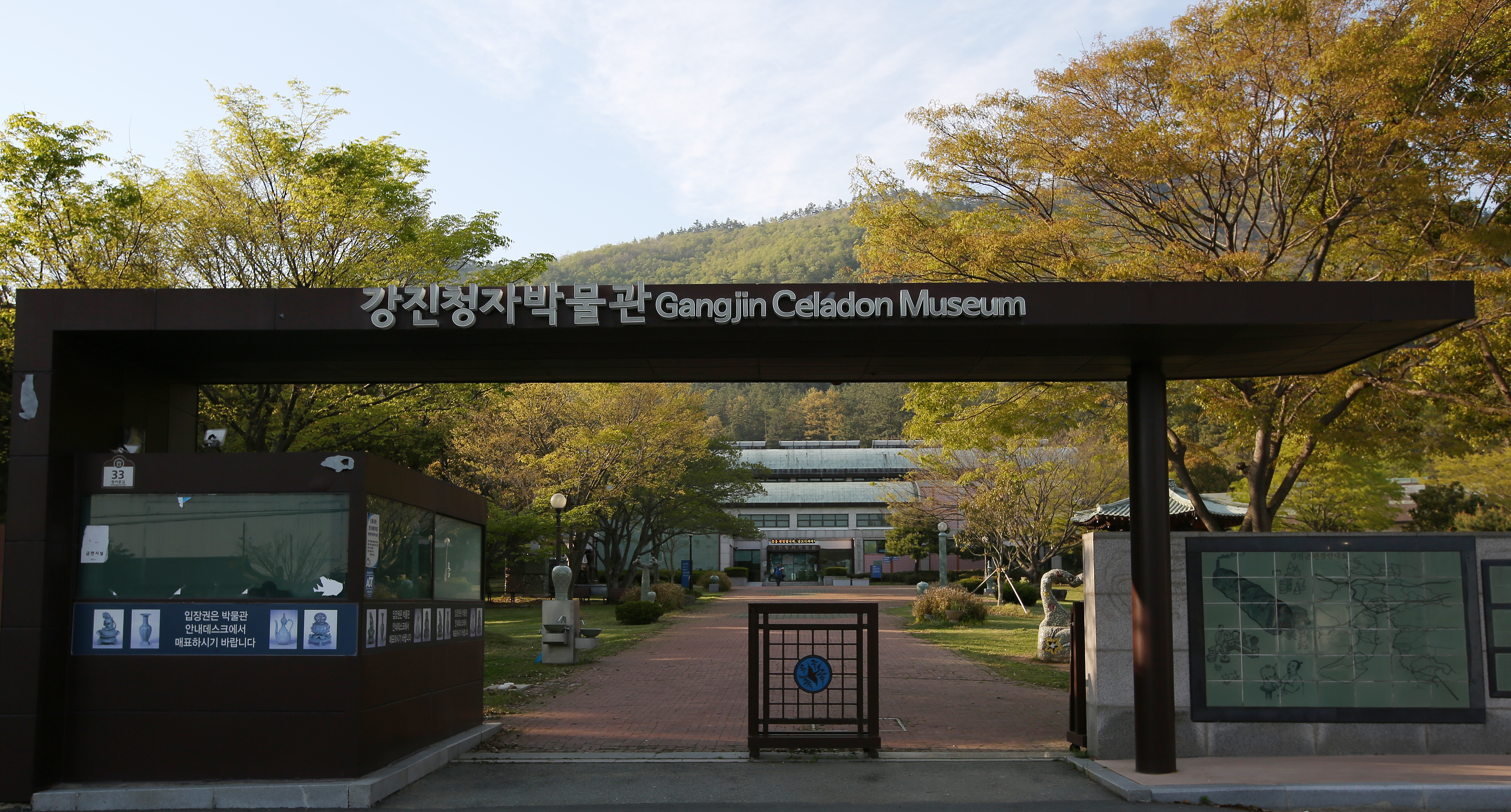
- Location: Gangjin County, South Jeolla Province, South Korea
- Coordinates: 34.5086°N 126.8008°E
- Website: www.celadon.go.kr

The Goryeo Celadon Museum (Korean: 고려청자박물관), formerly known also as the Gangjin Celadon Museum, is a museum located in Sadang-ri, Gangjin County, South Jeolla Province, South Korea. It was opened in 1997 and features the history of the Gangjin Kiln Sites.

About 200 celadon sites are distributed in the area where the Goryeo Celadon Museum is located. It can be said to be the birthplace and treasure trove of Goryeo celadon.

The museum's collection has about 30,000 pieces of Goryeo celadons and actively holds exhibitions for informing the people about Korean Celadons and its props. Some of kilns were reconstructed to reenact the way people of Goryeo made the celadons.

== See also ==
- Korean pottery and porcelain
- Haegang Ceramics Museum in Shindun-myeon, Icheon
- Ceramics museums in South Korea
