= Geumgoksa =

Buddhist temple

Geumgok Temple
- Location within South Korea

Religion
- Affiliation: Buddhism

Location
- Location: Pasan-ri, Gundong-myeon, Gangjin County, South Jeolla Province
- Country: South Korea
- Coordinates: 34.666436°N 126.776787°E

Korean name
- Hangul: 금곡사
- Hanja: 金谷寺
- RR: Geumgoksa
- MR: Kŭmgoksa

Geumgoksa or Geumgok Temple (Korean: 금곡사) is a Buddhist temple in Gangjin county, South Jeolla province, South Korea. Its name means "Golden Valley Temple". Three temples and numerous smaller shrines and burial mounds comprise the site. It is noted for its scenery as well as a 3-tiered stone pagoda that dates to the Goryo Dynasty.

== See also ==
- Boeunsan
