= Intaglio (conference) =

- Genre: Business
- Dates: January
- Locations: Kolkata (Calcutta), India
- Years active: 20
- Founded: 1989
- Attendance: 15,000 participant registrations, 190 companies
- Patron: Indian Institute of Management Calcutta

Intaglio is the annual international business school summit hosted by the Indian Institute of Management Calcutta. The flagship event of IIM-C was started in 1989 as the National Business School Meet (NBSM). Intaglio, traditionally held over a three-day weekend in December, serves as a platform facilitating the interaction of eminent personalities from the industry, academia, media and government, holding conferences, workshops and seminars by experts in different fields on a wide range of topics.

Intaglio in 2007 became the first event of its kind in India to achieve the ISO 9001:2000 certification from the International Organization for Standardization.

In 2010, Intaglio got the distinction of being the first carbon-neutral B-school event in India. This was achieved through a number of environmentally friendly measures, such as using notepads and bags made of recycled paper, while encouraging the use of social networking sites, emails and SMS to publicize the event.

== History ==
The original version of Intaglio – The National Business School Meet – was started by the 25th Batch of IIM Calcutta in the year 1989. The meet consisted of a myriad of competitions viz. Strategy building competitions, presentation competition "Shastrarth" and the like.

The meet was rechristened "Intaglio" in the January 2002 edition.

Intaglio 2008-09 was held on the IIM Calcutta campus from 8 – 11 January 2009, this edition saw over 15,000 participants from more than 60 countries, and participation from 190 companies, The total prize money for winners across events amounted to INR 10 Lakhs.

Every year, Intaglio organizes "Reverberations", a series of lectures by management and business leaders.

== Showcase Events ==
=== Olympus ===
Olympus is the flagship event of Intaglio. It aims at identifying the most promising future leader amongst the students of the 6 IIMs (Ahmedabad, Bangalore, Calcutta, Indore, Kozhikode, Lucknow) and select international B-schools.

In 2009, the event was won by Ms. Joo Yi from CEIBS, China. Repeating the institute's success, the following 2010 edition of the event was won by Mr. John Timms from CEIBS, China.

=== Wizards of Biz ===
This boardroom challenge aims at testing the all round business acumen of the participants. This game requires the participants to allocate resources, battle uncertainty and tackle competition by making the most of the limited resources available. This is the first competition in the country to have in-house real time business simulation software. Prelims give the candidates a feel of running a full-scale business in a completely dynamic environment. Those who manage to clear the preliminary rounds are further put to test in the on-campus finals involving multiple rounds of business challenges where decision making and strategic thinking are prerequisites to survive. The final round is designed to match a high pressure boardroom battle where the participants don the hats of the top-level management of a firm for the coveted title.

== Social Initiatives ==
Intaglio undertakes several social initiatives. In Intaglio 2008-09 started by holding team-building, creativity and public speaking workshops in Kendriya Vidyalaya School; this was a year-long initiative taken by the Intaglio team.

With 2009 being the year of general elections, Intaglio partnered ‘Jaago Re’ in spreading awareness about the elections to the youth of India. Furthermore, live events like inviting NGOs working with local artisans/children to exhibit their handiworks and screening daily social documentaries, were conducted.
