= Gangjin Kiln Sites =

Goryeo-era kilns in Gangjin, South Korea

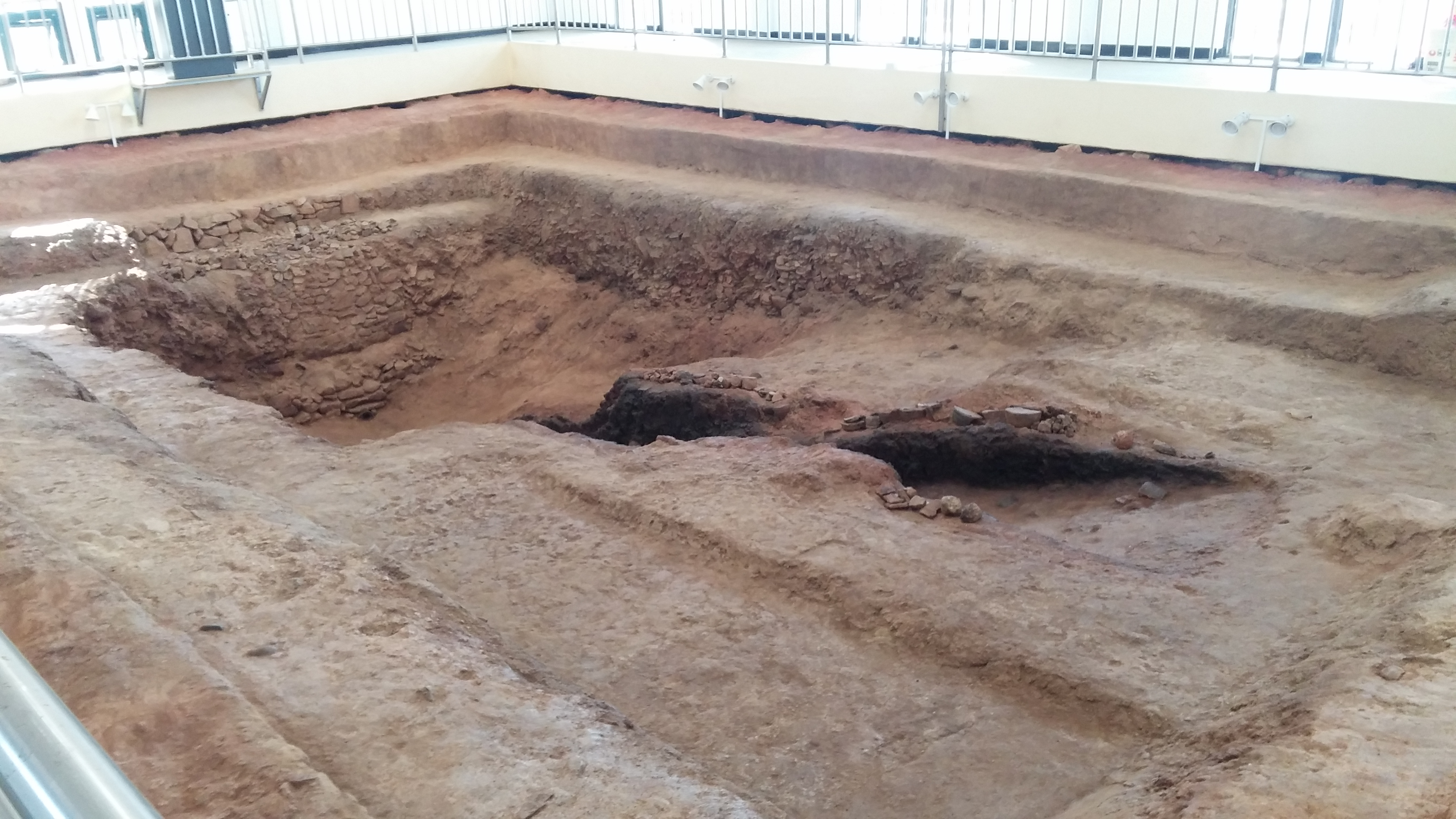
- Part of the site
- Interactive map of Gangjin Kiln Sites
- 34°30′30″N 126°48′3″E

Historic Sites of South Korea
- Official name: Goryeo Celadon Kiln Site, Gangjin
- Designated: 1963-01-21
- Reference no.: 68

Korean name
- Hangul: 강진고려청자요지
- Hanja: 康津高麗靑瓷 窯址
- Revised Romanization: Gangjin Goryeo cheongja yoji
- McCune–Reischauer: Kangjin Koryŏ ch'ŏngja yoji

Gangjin Kiln Sites (Korean: 강진 고려청자 요지) refers to a number of Goryeo-era archaeological sites in Gangjin County, South Jeolla Province, South Korea. The sites consist of 188 kilns which produced Goryeo ware.

On January 21, 1963, 98 of the kilns were designated a Historic Site of South Korea. On January 9, 1994, 188 of the kilns were proposed by South Korea as a tentative UNESCO World Heritage Site.

== History ==
There are two known major groups of earthenware and celadon kiln sites from the Goryeo period: these in Gangjin County and those in Buan County in North Jeolla Province. Across these two areas, around 400 kiln sites have been discovered.

In Gangjin County, the more than 75 kilns are in Yongun-ri, 59 are in and around Gyeyul-ri, 43 are in Sadang-ri, and 6 are in Sudong-ri. The Yongun-ri kilns are in relatively good condition, and date to the 10th through 11th centuries. The Gyeyul-ri kilns date to around the 11th and 13th centuries. Most of the Sadang-ri kilns date to around the 12th and 13th centuries, although they are in poorer condition, as many of them had been converted to farmland in the past. The Sudong-ri kilns date to around the 13th and 14th centuries, but are also in poor condition due to previous use for agriculture.

The Daegumyeon kiln site was rediscovered in 1914. Excavations unearthed a wide variety of pottery fragments diverse in shape, size and colors. The Daegumyeon kiln site is unusual because of the high concentration of kilns and because the dates of these kilns range throughout the entire Goryeo Dynasty. This site, therefore, is very valuable as a resource for scholars and archaeologists. A fully restored kiln based on those excavations is now housed at the National Museum of Korea. The Goryeo Celadon Office was established in 1986 to preserve kiln sites and also to reproduce and reconstruct the techniques lost many hundreds of years ago.

The Goryeo Celadon Museum in Gangjin features the history of the sites and houses a collection.

== See also ==
- List of World Heritage Sites in South Korea
- Joseon white porcelain
- Korean pottery and porcelain
