= Kim Yeong-nang =

Korean poet (1903–1950)

- Hangul: 김윤식
- Hanja: 金允植
- RR: Gim Yunsik
- MR: Kim Yunsik

Pen name
- Hangul: 김영랑
- Hanja: 金永郞
- RR: Gim Yeongrang
- MR: Kim Yŏngnang

Kim Yeong-nang (January 16, 1903 – September 29, 1950) was a Korean writer from Gangjin county, South Jeolla province, in present-day South Korea, where he spent most of his life. He participated in the Korean independence movement and as a teenager was jailed for six months in Daegu. Though he was a noted performer of traditional Korean music, he also loved classical Western music and was one of the few of his time who could read and appreciate English language poetry, Keats and Yeats being among his favorites.

When the Japanese oppression was at its height, he alone in Gangjin refused to change his name or offer worship at the Shinto shrine. Many of his earlier poems clearly express opposition to Japanese rule, and after Korea's liberation in 1945 he voiced his disquiet at the political polarisation that was tearing the country apart. When the growing unrest came to threaten the life of his family, he moved to Seoul, where he died as the result of a shrapnel wound to the stomach during the Korean War.

== Writing ==
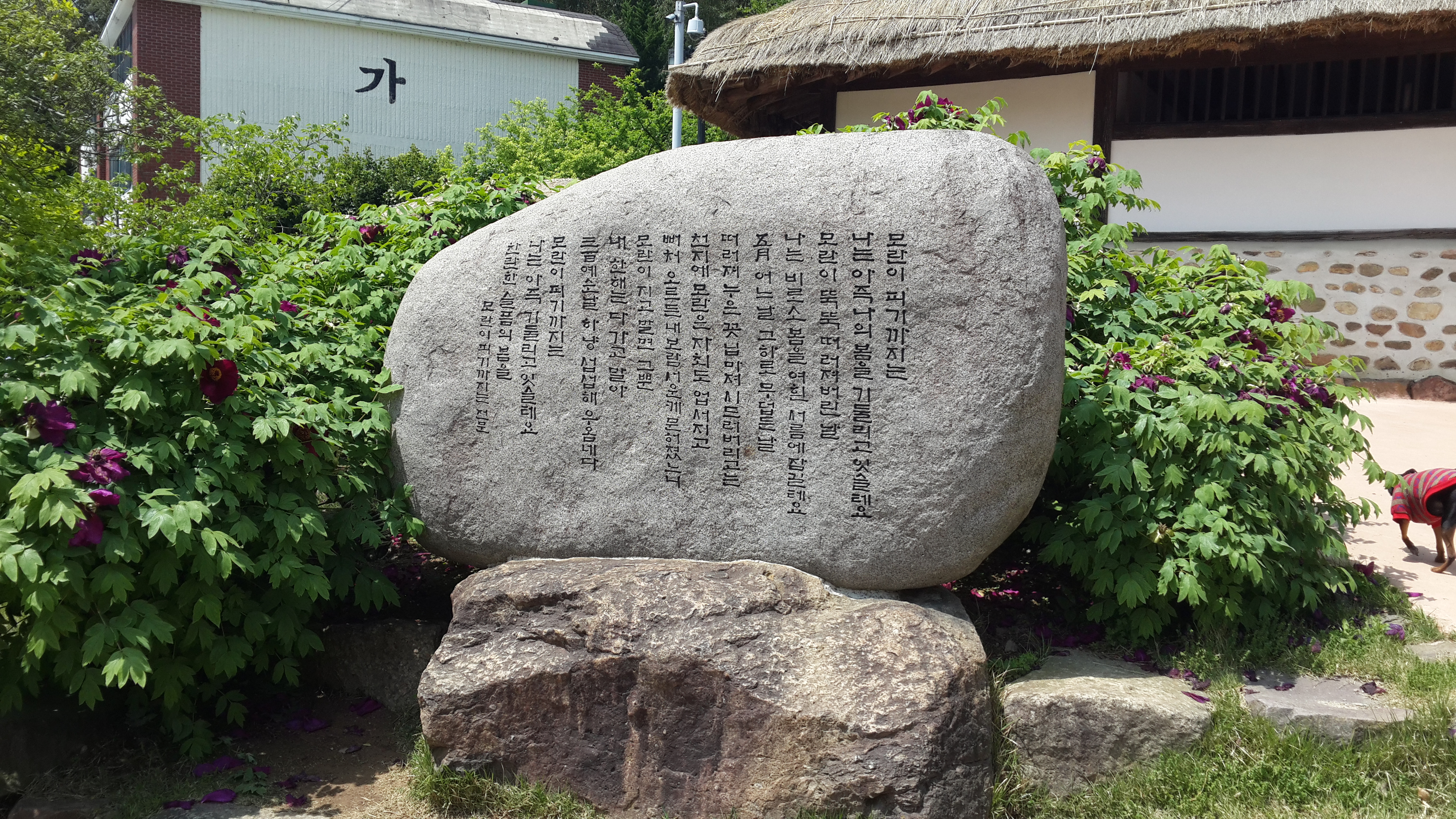
Monument to the poet at his old home

Under the penname Yeongrang, Kim Yeong-nang was especially active in literature during the 1930s and 1940s. Most of his poems experiment with modernism at the same time as exploring native Korean rhythms and he was well known for writing in the unique Jeolla dialect. Partly this was because Japanese prohibitions led patriotic Koreans to emphasise traditional aesthetics.

His translator, Brother Anthony of Taizé, has commented on the poet's reputation that it is currently growing in Korea. At first he tended to be overlooked in political times because he was only briefly in prison (in 1919), and later because he died before the post-Liberation literary influences and cliques formed. For a long time he was known only as the writer of a single poem, the much anthologized ("Until Peonies Bloom"). The Government's posthumous presentation in 2008 of its highest award for achievement in the field of culture, the Gold Crown Order of Cultural Merit, set the seal on his recognition. The recent translation of his complete poems is now bringing him to the attention of those outside his country.
