= Yu Geun-Hyeong =

Korean ceramist

Yu Geun-Hyeong (유근형; 柳根瀅), pen name Haegang, (April 5, 1894 – January 20, 1993) was a Korean ceramist and played the leading role in the revival of Goryeo celadon.

His name is also written as Ryu, Yu Geun-Hyeong, Yu Kun-hyong, Yoo Geun-hyung, Yoo Keun-Hyeong. The studio name is written as Haegang or Hae-Gang.

== Biography ==
Yu Geun-Hyeong was born in Seoul and attended Boseong Middle School. After graduation, and during much of his first 50 years, Korea was under Japanese rule.

In 1911, he began his career as a potter at the Hanyang Koryo Ceramics Factory located in Shindang-dong, Seoul. A short while later he switched to a new factory called Kanyo K̄oraiyaki established in 1912 by Umii Benzo (b. 1875) in today's Jangchung-dong, Seoul. This second factory was built to supply the growing Japanese demand for Goryeo style celadons. In 1913 the firm opened an outlet within the Tokyo's business district Nihonbashi which likely sold Yu's earliest works. Yu's works were also likely sold at exhibitions held in Tokyo in 1914 and 1917. The firm became one of two suppliers of Goryeo wares to the Mitsukoshi Department Store in Seoul. This store was frequented by Japanese tourists looking for souvenirs. Kanyo K̄oraiyaki became the main supplier for the Mitsukoshi's Tokyo branch when it opened its Oriental section in 1921. According to one report, Yu may have been sent to Japan in 1921. The Mitsukoshi Tokyo store continued to market Korean ceramic wares and host exhibitions of works by Yu and other Korean ceramists like Shin Sang-ho at least until the 1990's.

The 1923 Great Kanto earthquake destroyed the Tokyo branch of Kanyo K̄oraiyaki and drove the firm into debt. This forced Umii to sell to rival Japanese industrialist Tomita Gisaku. Gisaku had established Sanwa Goryeo Celadon Ware in 1908 in the town of Nampo in South P'yong'an Province (now North Korea). According to professor Woo of the Department of Ceramics and Glass, Hongik University College and Fine Arts Curator, Korea Modern Celadon, credit for the rediscovery of the lost art of making Goryeo style celadons should be attributed to Gisaku.

Members of the Yi Royal Family, that had been absorbed into the Imperial House of Japan, controlled many of the shares of Gisaku's firm. This allowed the newly expanded firm to take on the name Yi Royal Household Art Workshop. Yu's position in the new firm is described as having evolved from being a potter to being an engineer. He was sent around the country from factory to factory to improve operations. Yu's experiments with kiln designs, and different clays are said to have played an essential role in advancing the production of quality Goryeo style wares.

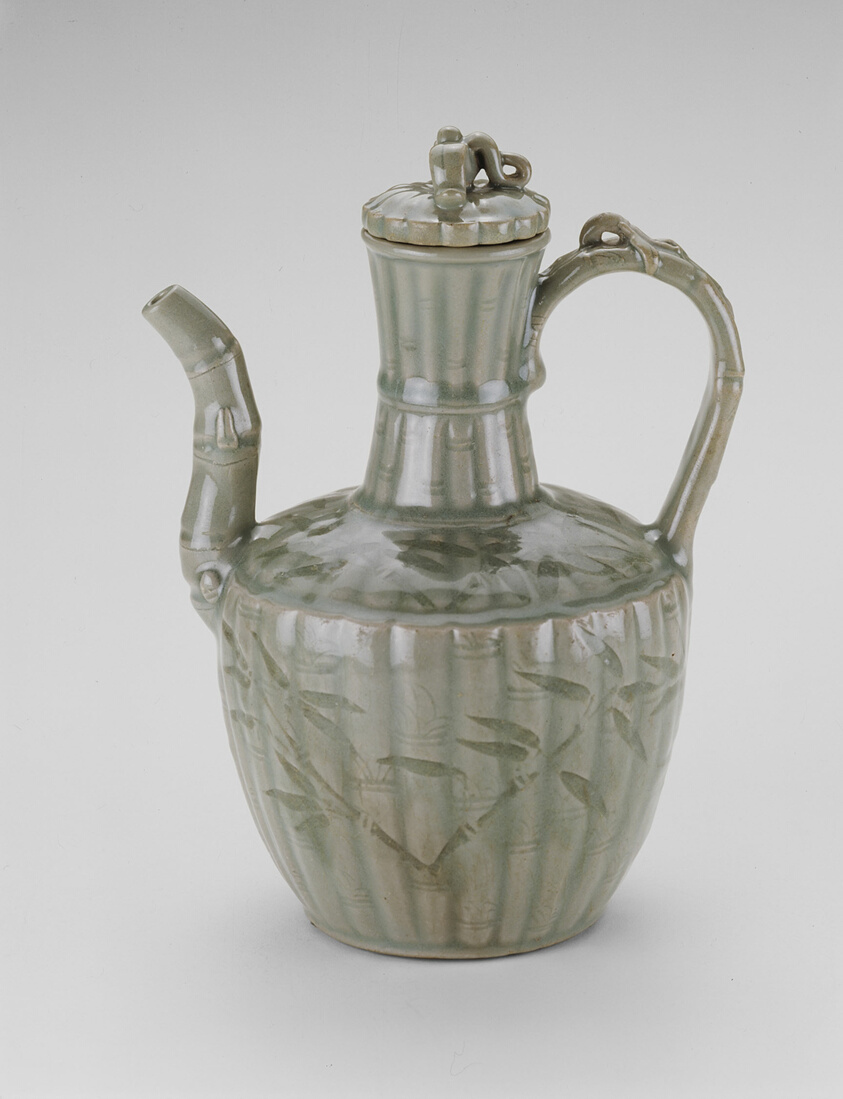
Goryeo Period pitcher at the Art Institute of Chicago which is the basis of some of Yu's reproductions

Yu established a friendship with at least one of the Japanese brothers Noritaka and Takumi Asakawa. The Asakawa brothers were two early advocates for traditional Korean ceramics. Noritaka reportedly surveyed 700 sites of old kilns, recovered and classified an enormous quantity of ceramic artifacts. Likely, Yu's association with the Asakawa brothers introduced him to many artifacts which Yu learned to reproduce.

In 1928, Yu's celadon works were entered into the Chugai Industrial Exhibition, held in Beppu, Japan. He took the gold medal.

He dedicated himself to the restoration of the celadon genre, working first at the Songbuk kiln at the Korea Arts and Culture Research Center at the Kansong Art Museum in 1954, and later at the Korean Formal Arts Research Center in Taebang-dong. In the 1960s, he built his own kiln in Icheon, Gyeonggi-do.

According to dates he incorporated into some of his works supplied into the Japanese market, he continued working well into his 90s.

The name of his studio was Haegang (해강; 海剛), which was located in Gyeonggi Province outside Seoul.

He established the Haegang Research Institute in Shindun-myeon, Icheon in 1960, using the many materials he had collected over his decades of research in the field.

He was honored by the government as a Living National Treasure as holder of Intangible Cultural Property No.13 of Gyeonggi Province.

- The museum website can be found here: Haegang Ceramics Museum
- A film illustrating the museum's collection can be found: Haegang Ceramics Museum - YouTube

His work was documented in the film Koryo Celadon in 1979, which was nominated for an Academy Award for Best Documentary Short.

His work is held in public collections, including The Asian Art Museum of San Francisco (object number 1992.232) and The British Museum (object number 1992,0623.1-2)

== Works ==
During his many decades Yu produced a great number of ceramic works including:

- Pre-celadon works.
- Everyday celadon wares like cups, teapots, and bowels for the local Korean market
- Decorative celadon wares for sale at exhibitions, many of which took place in Japan
- Large works of celadon for display at exhibitions
- Reproductions of Korean National Treasures
- Innovative works especially large reticulated vases
