= Gangjin County =

Coordinates: 34°38′26″N 126°46′12″E

Gangjin
- County
- Flag Emblem of Gangjin

- Location in South Korea
- Country: South Korea
- Region: Honam
- Provincial-level city: Jeonnam-Gwangju
- Administrative divisions: 1 eup, 10 myeon

Area
  - Total: 495.98 km^{2} (191.50 sq mi)

Population (September 2024)
  - Total: 32,306
  - Density: 99.3/km^{2} (257/sq mi)
  - Dialect: Jeolla

Korean name
- Hangul: 강진군
- Hanja: 康津郡
- RR: Gangjin-gun
- MR: Kangjin-gun

Gangjin County (Korean: 강진군) is a county in Jeonnam-Gwangju, South Korea. Gangjin county proper was established in 1895. The county office is located in Gangjin-eup.

The Gangjin Kiln Sites are a noted area for the production of traditional Goryeo celadon, and annually a big festival and symposium on celadon porcelain at the Goryeo Celadon Museum with participants from all over the world takes place in Gangjin city.

Additionally, it is the birthplace of Korean poet Yeongrang Kim Yun-sik, famous for his work in the 1930s and 1940s in the Jeolla dialect.

The county bird is the magpie. The county flower is the camellia, and the county tree is the ginkgo. There are also two mascots, Gang and Jin, who represent fire and water, respectively, and who appear throughout the county on signs and sidewalks.

A small portion of Wolchulsan National Park is located in Gangjin County.

There is a monument to 17th-century Dutch explorer Hendrick Hamel, the first westerner to experience and write about Korea's Joseon Dynasty era. Hamel and his men were shipwrecked on Jeju island, and they remained captives in Korea for 13 years.

== Other places of interest ==
- Gangjinman Bay, in Maryang-myeon.
- Geumgok Temple (금곡사), in Gangjin-eup.
- Baekryeon Temple (백련사), in Doam-myeon.
- Mt. Su-in (수인산), 561 meters, in Byeongyeong-myeon.
- Boeunsan (보은산), 439 meters, in Gangjin-eup

== Climate ==
Climate data for Gangjin (2010–2020 normals, extremes 2009–present)
| Month | Jan | Feb | Mar | Apr | May | Jun | Jul | Aug | Sep | Oct | Nov | Dec | Year |
|---|---|---|---|---|---|---|---|---|---|---|---|---|---|
| Record high °C (°F) | 18.6 (65.5) | 22.4 (72.3) | 23.2 (73.8) | 27.7 (81.9) | 32.8 (91.0) | 33.0 (91.4) | 37.4 (99.3) | 37.0 (98.6) | 35.0 (95.0) | 30.4 (86.7) | 25.5 (77.9) | 18.9 (66.0) | 37.4 (99.3) |
| Mean daily maximum °C (°F) | 6.1 (43.0) | 8.3 (46.9) | 13.3 (55.9) | 18.4 (65.1) | 23.9 (75.0) | 26.6 (79.9) | 29.1 (84.4) | 30.6 (87.1) | 26.9 (80.4) | 22.0 (71.6) | 15.6 (60.1) | 8.2 (46.8) | 19.1 (66.4) |
| Daily mean °C (°F) | 1.1 (34.0) | 2.9 (37.2) | 7.1 (44.8) | 12.3 (54.1) | 18.0 (64.4) | 22.0 (71.6) | 25.2 (77.4) | 26.4 (79.5) | 21.6 (70.9) | 15.7 (60.3) | 9.6 (49.3) | 3.1 (37.6) | 13.8 (56.8) |
| Mean daily minimum °C (°F) | −3.2 (26.2) | −1.8 (28.8) | 1.4 (34.5) | 6.4 (43.5) | 12.4 (54.3) | 18.3 (64.9) | 22.4 (72.3) | 23.0 (73.4) | 17.4 (63.3) | 10.4 (50.7) | 4.5 (40.1) | −1.5 (29.3) | 9.1 (48.4) |
| Record low °C (°F) | −14.3 (6.3) | −9.8 (14.4) | −5.5 (22.1) | −1.8 (28.8) | 2.7 (36.9) | 11.5 (52.7) | 15.2 (59.4) | 15.5 (59.9) | 9.3 (48.7) | −0.2 (31.6) | −3.5 (25.7) | −9.8 (14.4) | −14.3 (6.3) |
| Average precipitation mm (inches) | 29.7 (1.17) | 44.7 (1.76) | 80.4 (3.17) | 124.9 (4.92) | 122.9 (4.84) | 156.6 (6.17) | 233.7 (9.20) | 277.2 (10.91) | 164.3 (6.47) | 106.3 (4.19) | 64.9 (2.56) | 36.5 (1.44) | 1,442.1 (56.78) |
| Average precipitation days (≥ 0.1 mm) | 8.6 | 8.4 | 8.9 | 9.7 | 9.3 | 10.0 | 15.2 | 12.9 | 11.0 | 6.6 | 9.3 | 10.5 | 120.4 |
| Average relative humidity (%) | 66.4 | 64.6 | 64.8 | 66.4 | 69.1 | 76.6 | 82.8 | 81.7 | 79.2 | 71.8 | 70.5 | 68.0 | 71.8 |
| Mean monthly sunshine hours | 174.0 | 162.3 | 210.9 | 214.7 | 239.8 | 176.5 | 153.4 | 192.0 | 178.1 | 208.1 | 165.3 | 157.6 | 2,232.7 |
Source: Korea Meteorological Administration
