= Dangyangyu Kiln =

The Dangyangyu Kiln (当阳峪窑 Dangyangyu yao) was a private kiln in operation during the Northern Song dynasty, producing Cizhou ware. It is located in Xiuwu in Henan province, China, and is also known as the Xiuwu Kiln (修武窑 Xiuwu yao) or Xiuwu kiln. Dangyangyu is sometimes presented as Tangyangyu, Tangyang Yu or Tang Yang Yu.

The site of the Dangyangyu kiln (当阳峪窑址 Dangyangyu yaozhi) was placed on a list of protected sites of Henan in 2006. According to Li Huibing (李辉柄) of the China Research Centre for Ancient Ceramics (中国古陶瓷研究会 Zhongguo gu taoci yanjiuhui) it stands together with the famous kilns: Ru yao, Jun yao and Ding yao, which produced Ru ware, Jun ware and Ding ware.

== Ceramics from the Dangyangyu Kiln ==
Ceramic ware from the Dangyangyu Kiln is present in collections of ceramics in China, and outside of China. For example, at the British Museum, and the Harvard Art Museums.
