= Nanfeng Kiln =

Tourist attraction in Guangdong, China

Coordinates: 23°00′26″N 113°04′20″E

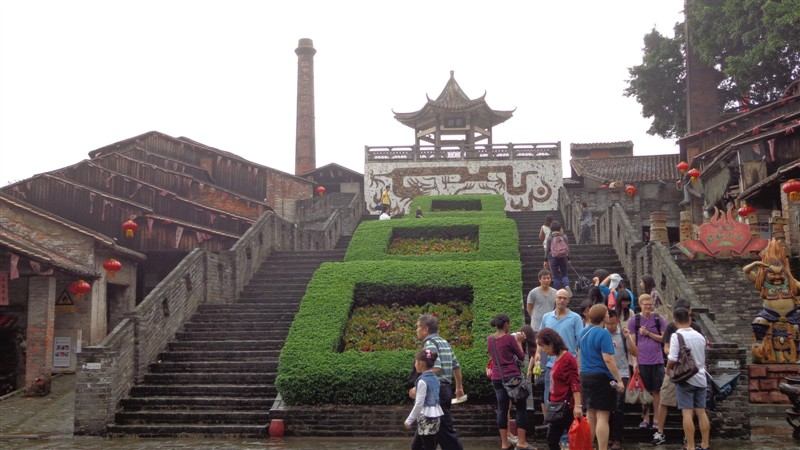
Ancient Nanfeng Kiln is an attraction in Ancient Nanfeng Kiln Cultural and Creative Zone of Foshan city.

Nanfeng Kiln (Chinese: 南风古灶; pinyin: Nánfēng gǔ zào; Jyutping: naam^{4} fung^{1} gu^{2} zou^{3}) is a tourist attraction in the Ancient Nanfeng Kiln Cultural and Creative Zone, which is located in Shiwan Town, Chancheng District, Foshan city, Guangdong province of China. It was built in the Ming Dynasty Zhengde period (1506–1521), and has been continuously firing Shiwan ware for over 500 years so far.

== Introduction ==
Ancient Nanfeng Kiln is one of the eight attractions of Foshan, as well as a national key cultural relics protection units and AAAA level scenic spots. The main attractions are Shiwan Ceramics Museum, Shiwan Doll Street, International Ceramics Village, Ancient Stove Tree (Chinese: 古灶神榕; pinyin: gǔ zàoshén róng), The Lin's Hall (Chinese: 林家厅; pinyin: línjiā tīng) etc., with totally nine blessing spots: the god of fire (Chinese: 火神; pinyin: huǒ shén), Dragon Kiln (Chinese: 龙窑; pinyin: lóng yáo), Yunyong Pavilion (Chinese: 云涌亭; pinyin: yún yǒng tíng), God Banya (Chinese: 神榕; pinyin: shén róng), Scholars well (Chinese: 进士井; pinyin: jìnshì jǐng), Beidi Temple (Chinese: 北帝庙; pinyin: běi dì miào), Tank Falls (Chinese: 大缸瀑布; pinyin: dà gāng pùbù), WuDiShengGen (Chinese: 无地生根; pinyin: wú dì shēnggēn), and Lovesickness Desk (pinyin: xiāngsī tái).

== Main facilities ==
In the old days, the local people recalled Shiwan's kilns as firing ceramics stoves. There are many kinds of kilns, but the most famous ones are dragon kilns, since their shapes look like the huge flying dragon. Ancient Nanfeng Kiln's mouth faces southwards, while banyan trees are clustered at the back of the Furnace, and cold wind will do occur in the summer, therefore, it's called "Nanfeng Kiln".
