= Shiwan ware =

Type of Chinese pottery

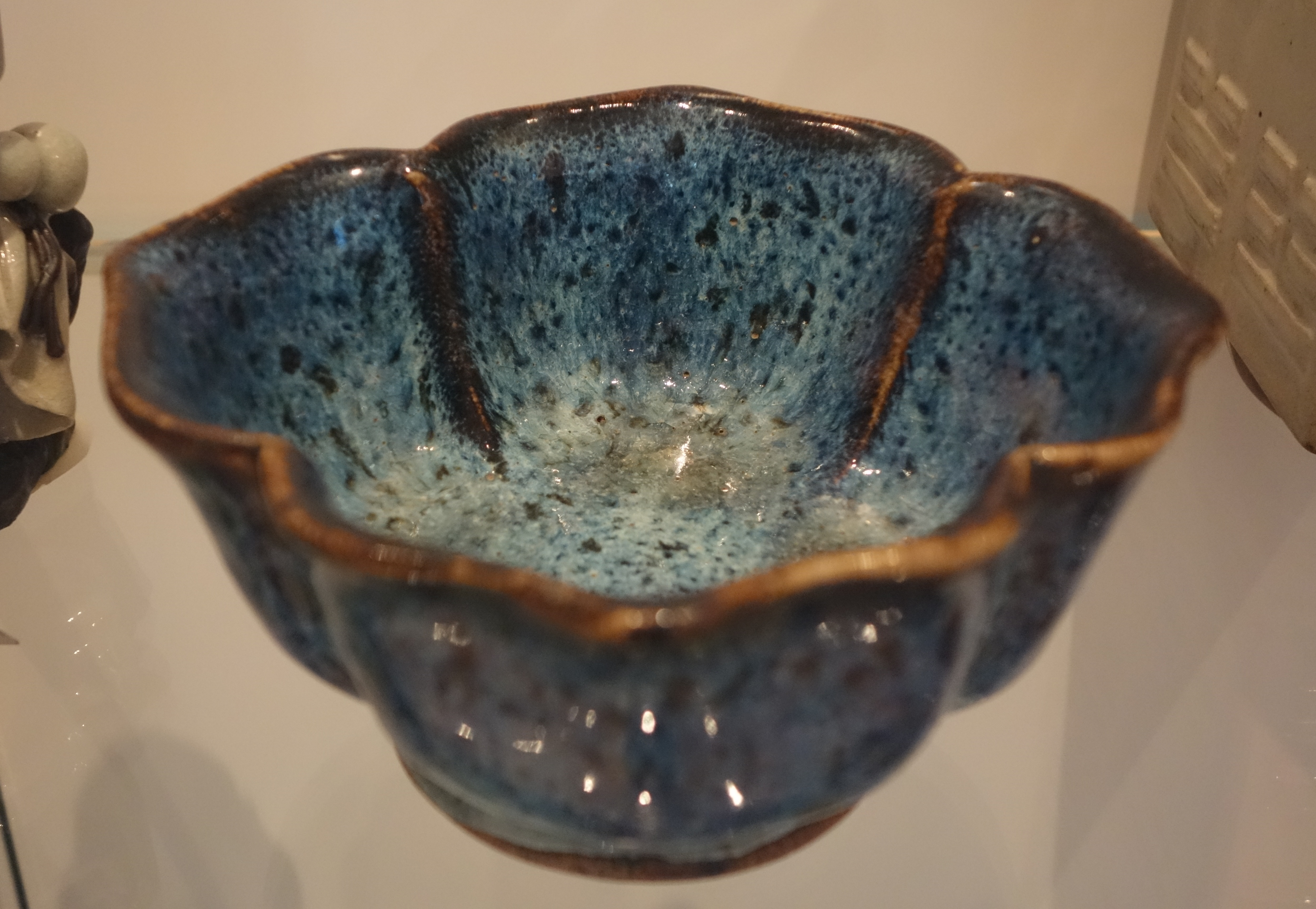
Bowl with Jun-style glaze, 19th century

Shiwan ware (Chinese: 石灣窯; pinyin: Shíwān yáo; Cantonese Jyutping: Sek6 waan1 jiu4) is Chinese pottery from kilns located in the Shiwanzhen Subdistrict of the provincial city of Foshan, near Guangzhou, Guangdong. It forms part of a larger group of wares from the coastal region known collectively as "Canton stonewares". The hilly, wooded, area provided slopes for dragon kilns to run up, and fuel for them, and was near major ports.

The area has been producing pottery since the Neolithic, and over 100 kiln-sites have now been excavated, but large-scale production of a variety of wares began under the late Ming dynasty, and continues to the present. The Nanfeng Kiln has been in operation for some 500 years, and is now a popular tourist attraction. Shiwan wares have been in a variety of styles, many for utilitarian purposes. Mostly they are (in Western terms) stoneware. Three types of wares especially associated with Shiwan are roof tiles and architectural ornaments, and from the Qing dynasty onwards, imitations of Jun ware and popular polychrome figurines.

== Wares ==
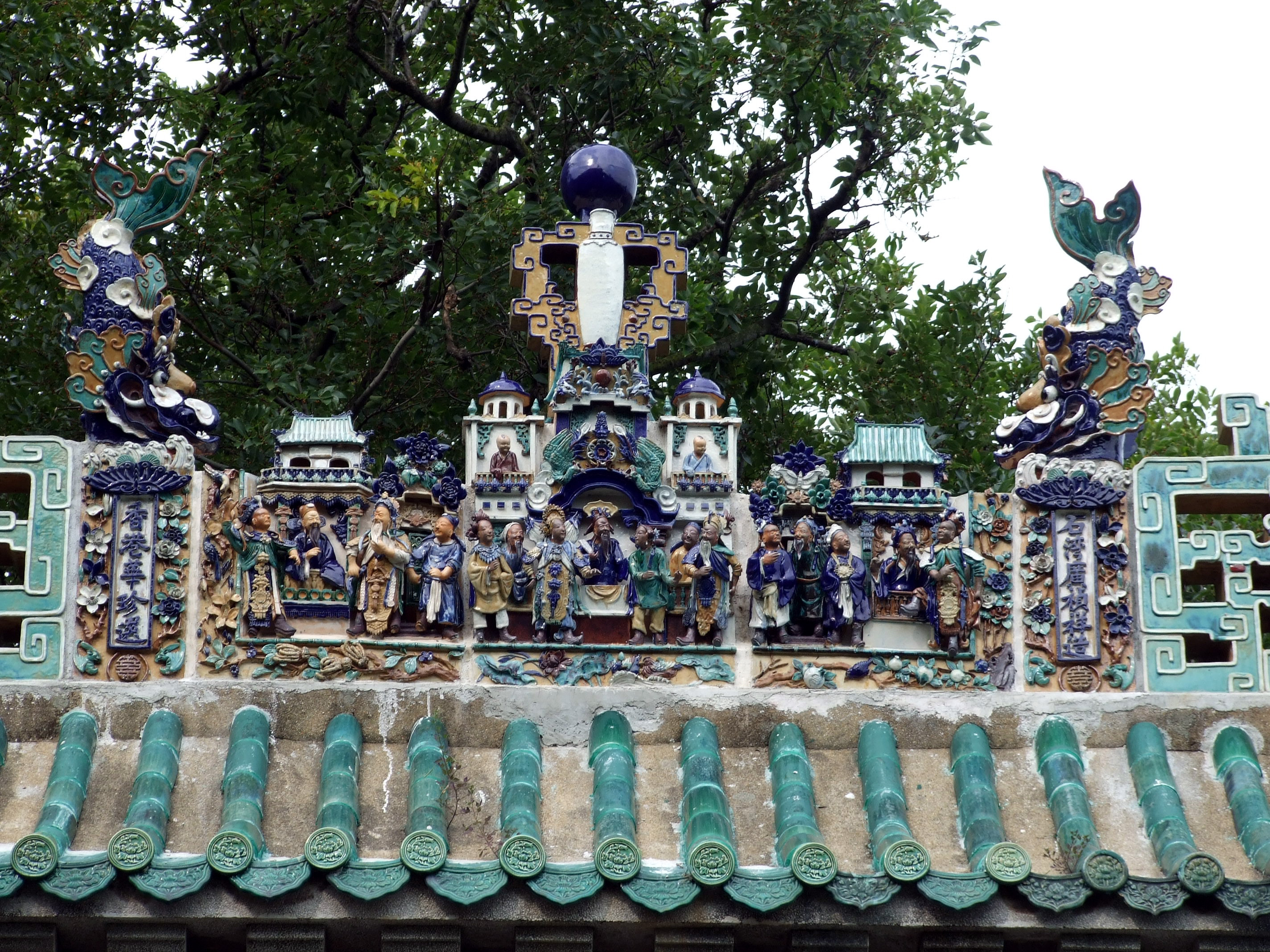
Glazed tiles and reliefs on a memorial archway in Hong Kong, 1920s

Earlier wares were mostly thick, heavily glazed and designed for practical purposes, and later decorative wares were still relatively rough by contemporary Chinese standards. The kilns were large producers of roof tiles, including the ornamented or fully sculptural elements used for larger buildings. They also produced large but elegant storage jars called martabans, which were perhaps sometimes distributed containing food products, and sometimes as empty vessels. Both tiles and martabans were widely exported to the rest of China and East Asia. Production of these seems to have begun in the late Ming Dynasty, or perhaps the early Qing dynasty.

At the same time the Shiwan kilns began to produce more decorative wares, using a range of coloured glazes that imitated famous wares of the classic Song dynasty. In particular the blue-to-purple glaze of Jun ware was imitated, on a variety of vessel shapes, and small figures. Such figures were, and remain, a third speciality of Shiwan, made for an essentially popular market. Initially they featured the same Buddhist figures as blanc de Chine from Dehua, but by the 19th century models of folk heroes and some satirical figures were produced; Shiwan was the major producer of such secular figurines. Bird and animal figures were also produced, all mostly using coloured glazes. Shiwan figures functioned as the Chinese equivalent of English Staffordshire figurines. The human figures sometimes contrast flesh areas left in unglazed biscuit with glazed clothes and hair. Gestures and facial expressions are often dramatic. The expansion of Shiwan's range may have been related to movements to the area of potters from Dehua and Jingdezhen.

Unlike other kiln centres like Jingdezhen, potter's marks were often used, allowing some to build up reputations among collectors, and giving some information about the structure of the industry, and lineages of potting families. Helped by its proximity to Hong Kong, Shiwan continues to be a leader in contemporary Chinese ceramics design.

Shiwan wares provide a contrast with more conservatively rendered Dehua efforts. Clay for the ware was provided not only from the local area, but also from distant locations that could be mixed to provide a variety of textures and desired ceramic outcomes. The range could extend from a porcelain, rivalling Dehua in purity, to a rough stoneware. Shiwan ware was widely exported. Its glazing techniques directly influenced Japanese Shiga wares and others.

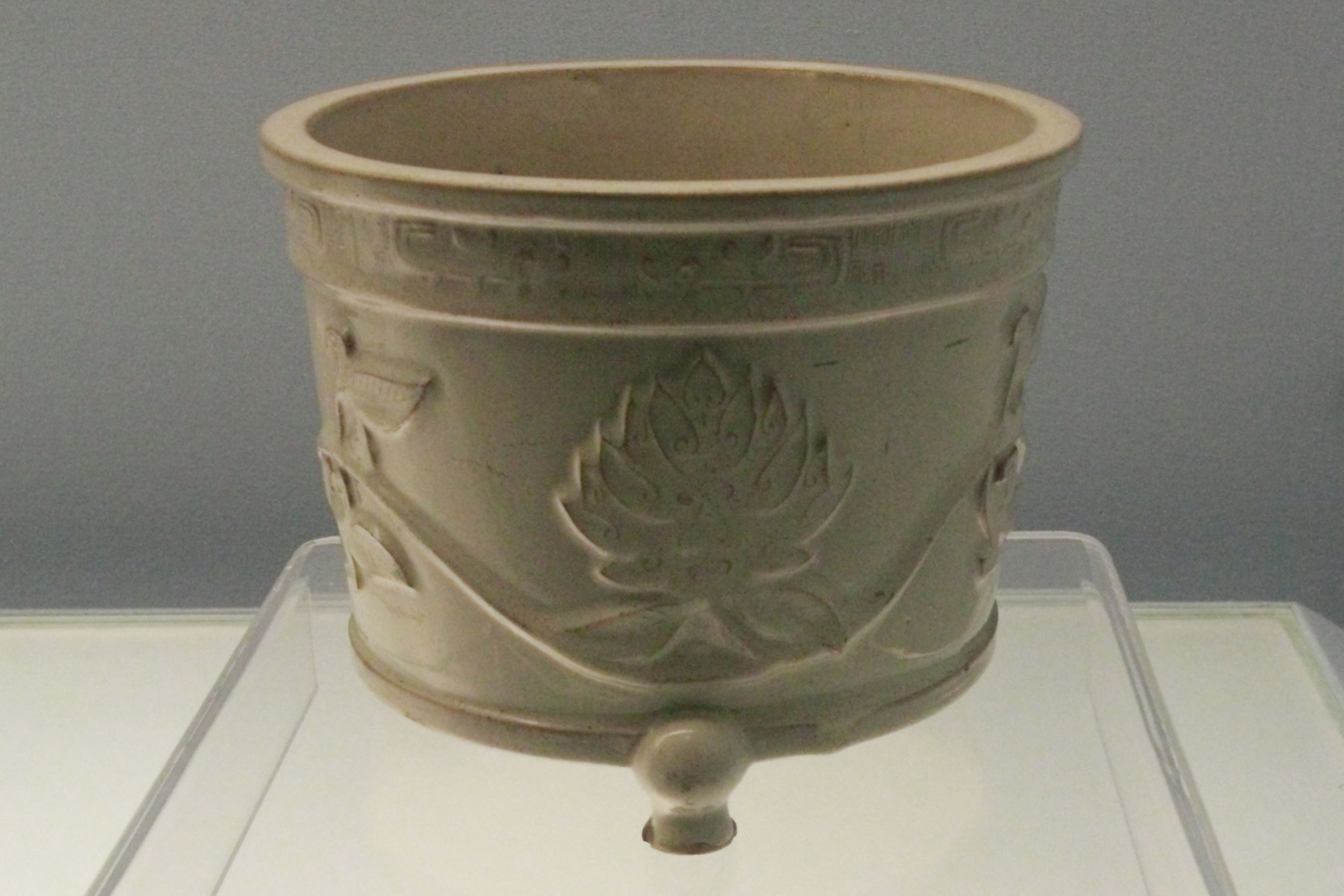
White glazed censer with applied interlaced lotus flowers, Ming

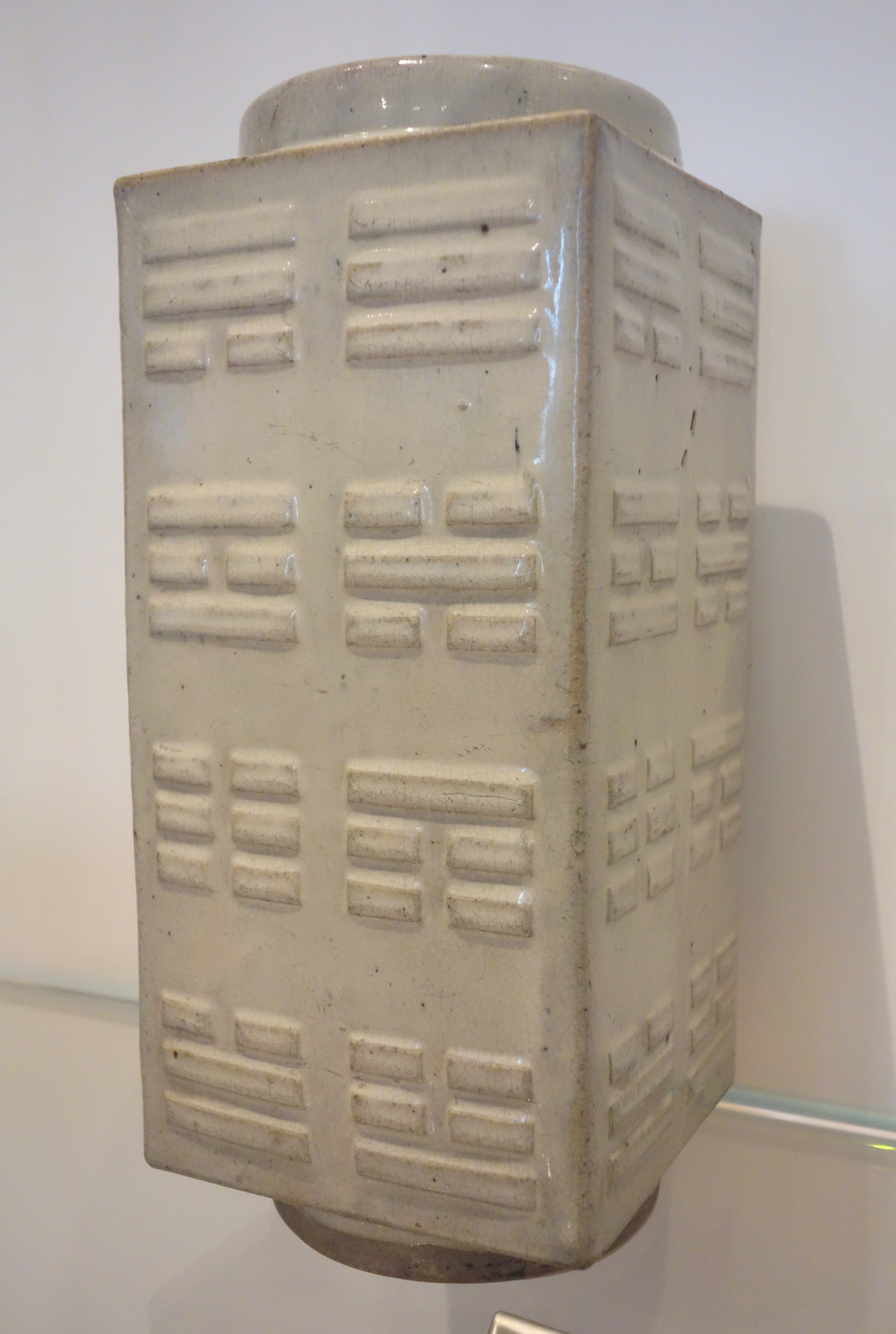
Qing vase, in the shape of ancient jade congs

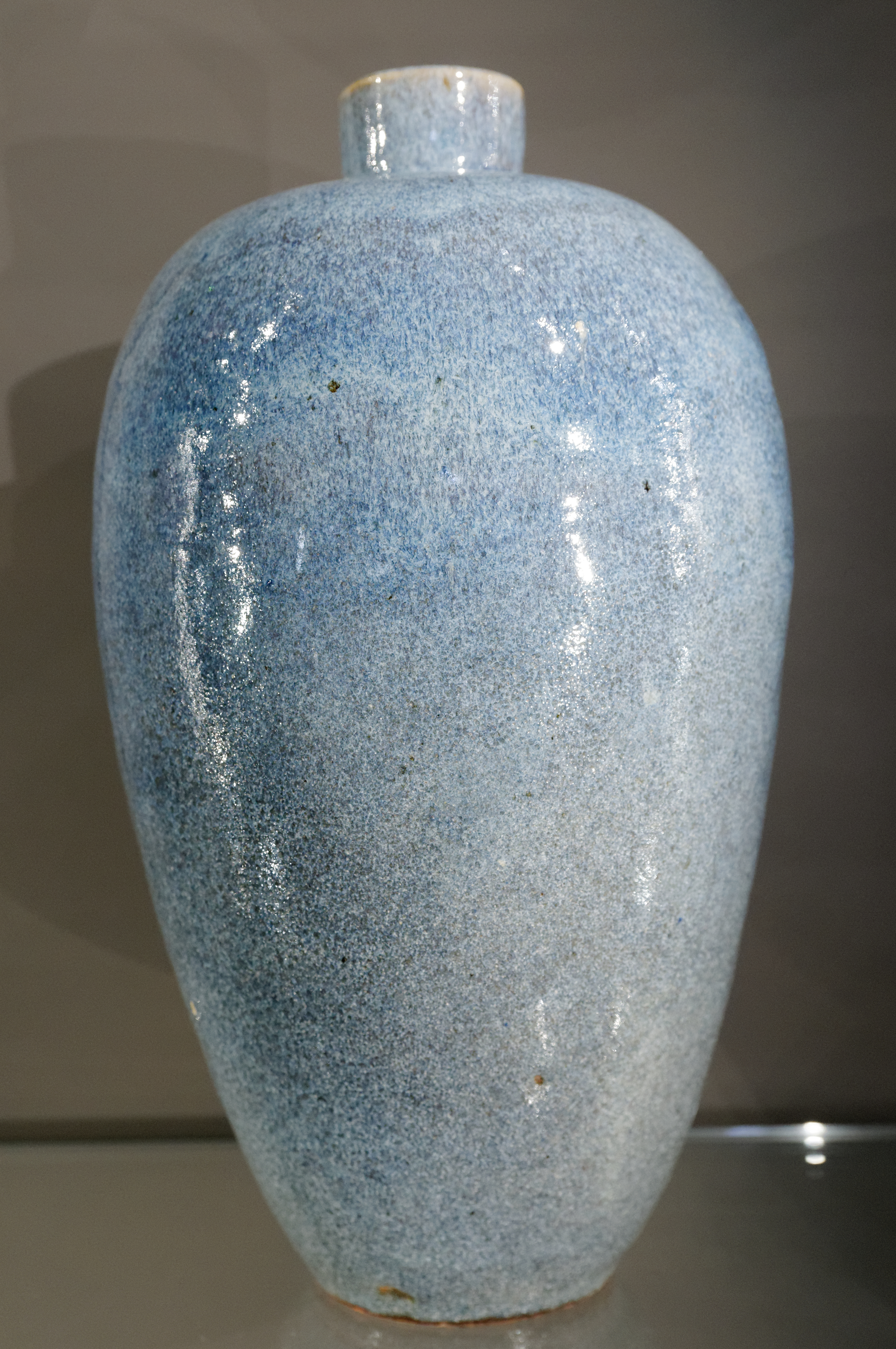
Meiping vase with imitation Jun glaze, 19th century, British Museum

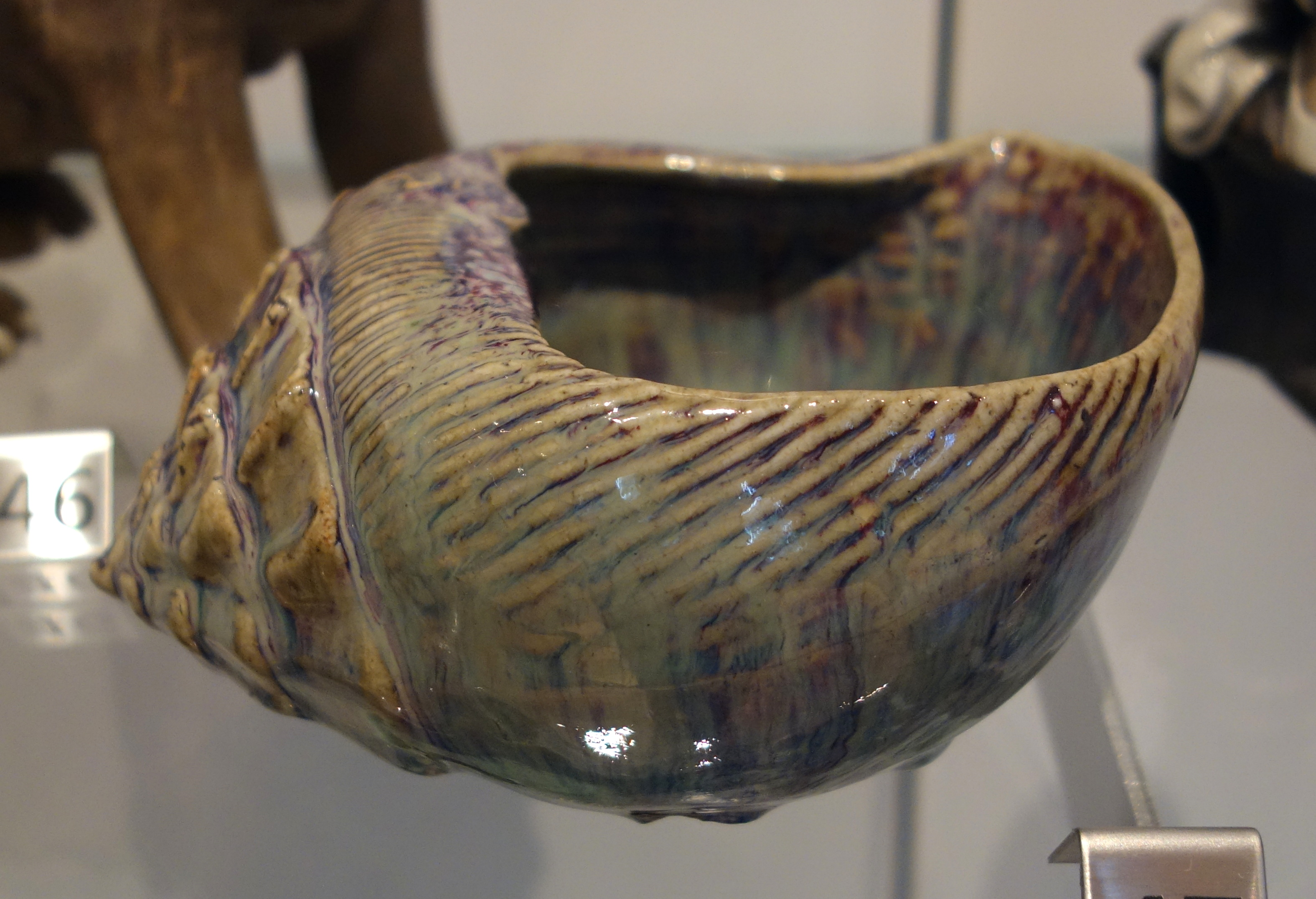
Water pot, 19th century

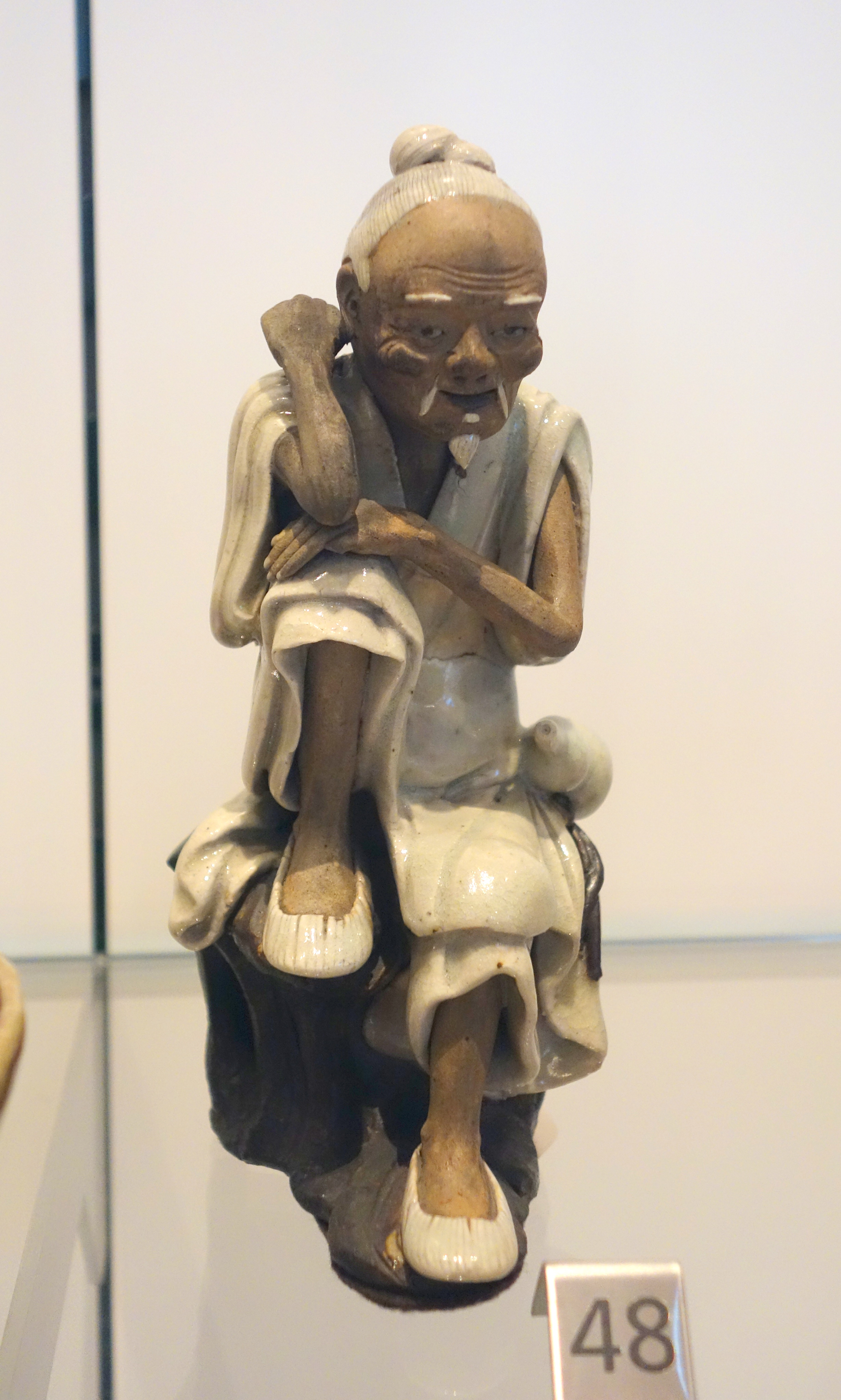
19th-century figure

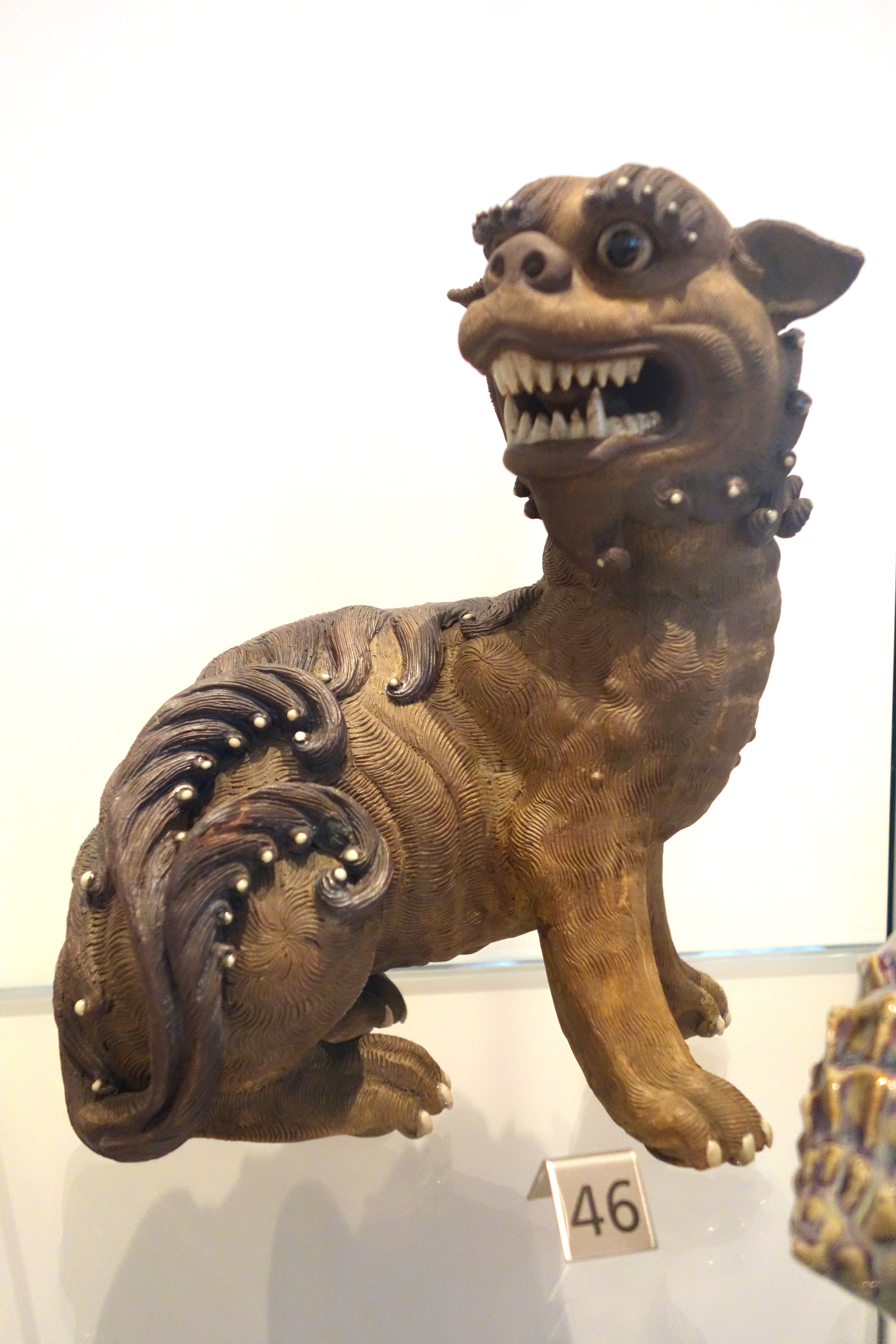
Lion figure, 19th century

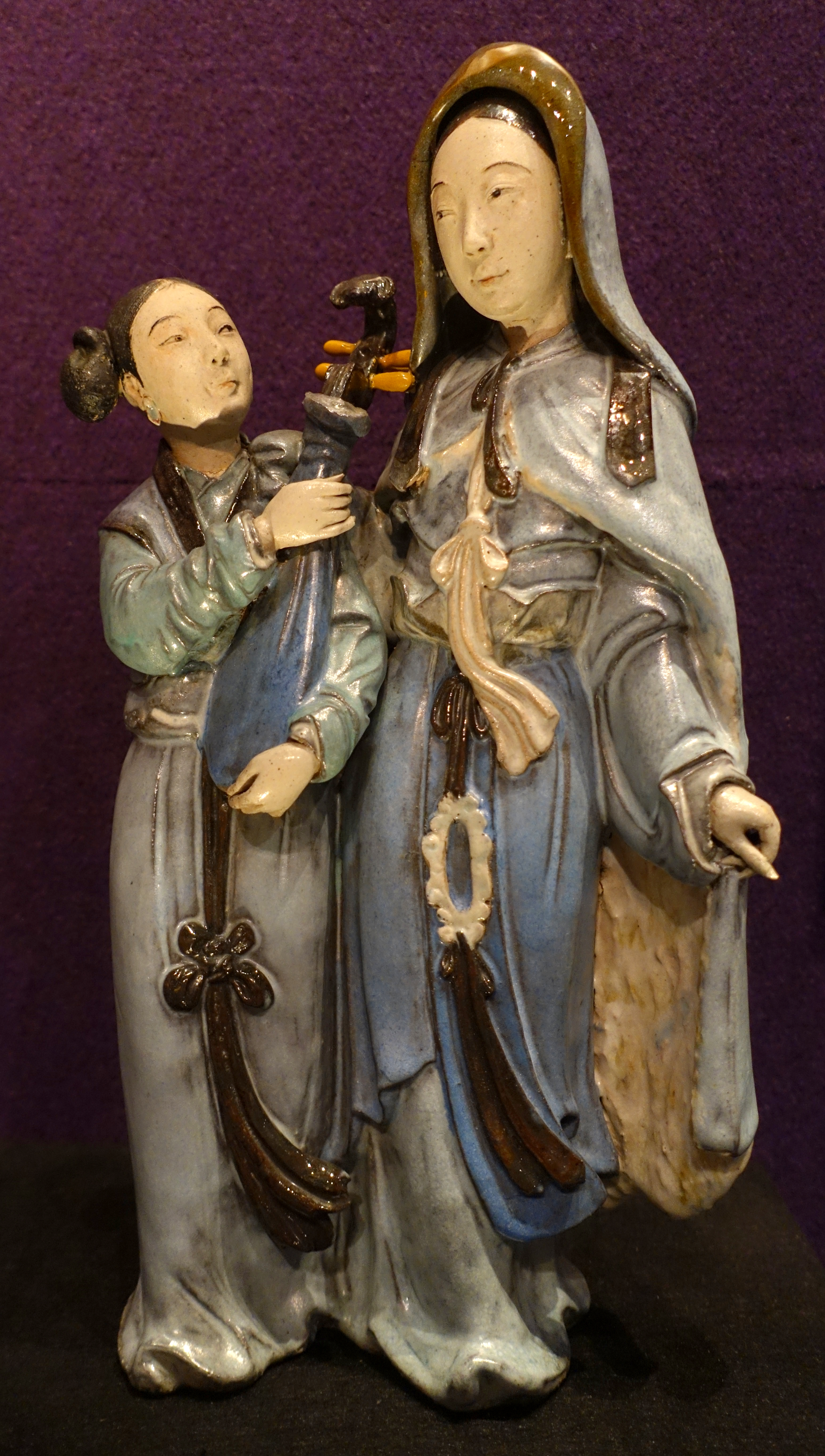
Wang Zhaojun Marrying the Xiongnu Ruler, by Chen Wei Yan (died 1926)

== See also ==
- Cantonese culture
