= Jun ware =

Chinese pottery style in the Song dynasty

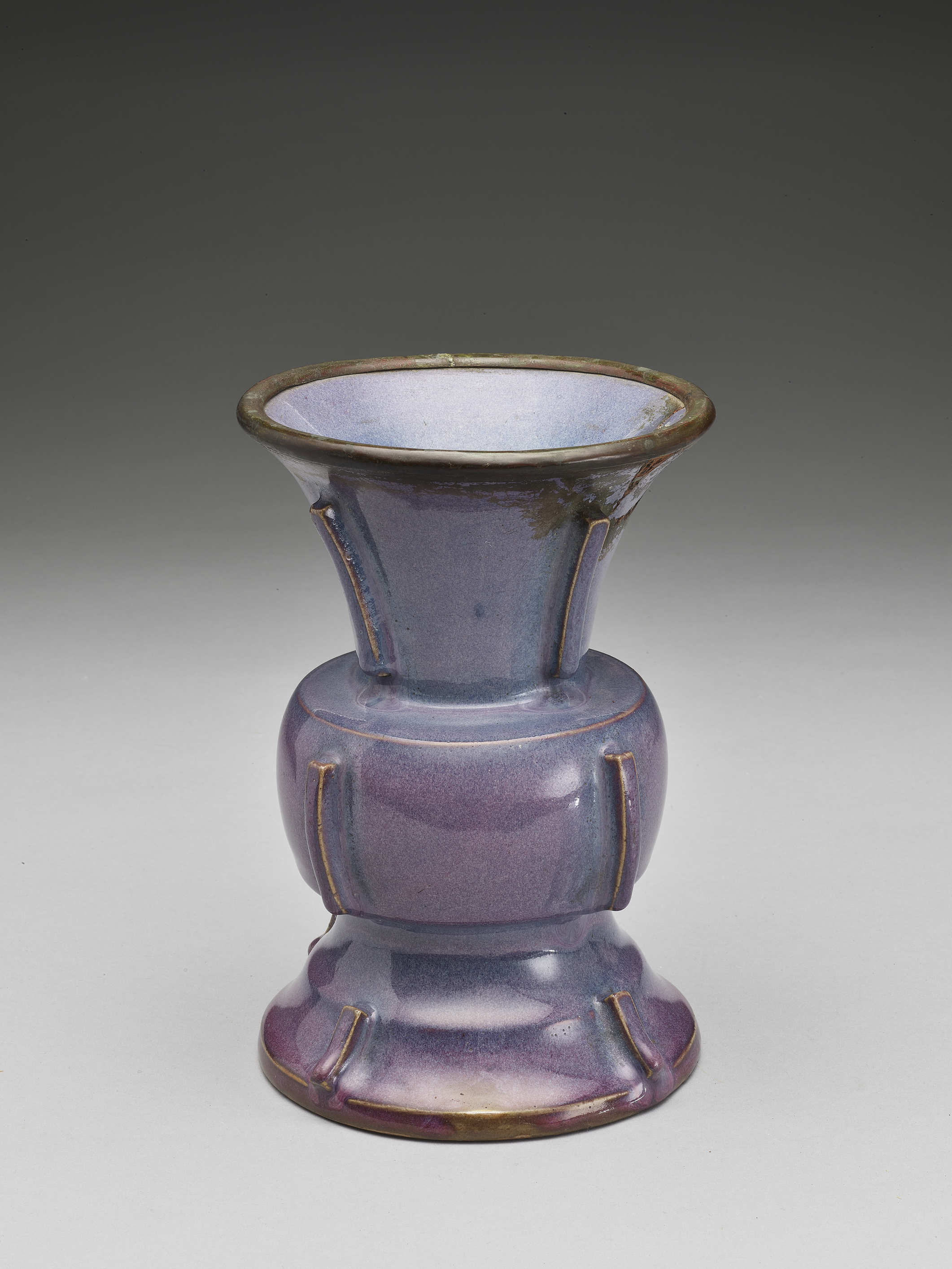
- Jun ware zun vessel with grape-purple glaze and flanges, Ming dynasty. National Palace Museum.
- Branch: Chinese ceramics
- Years active: Northern Song – Yuan dynasty (11th–14th century)
- Location: Yuzhou, Henan, China
- Influences: Ru ware, Yaozhou ware
- Influenced: Jingdezhen Jun-type wares (Ming–Qing dynasties), Shiwan ware

Jun ware (Chinese: 鈞窯; pinyin: Jūn yáo; Wade–Giles: Chün-yao) is a type of Chinese pottery, one of the Five Great Kilns of Song dynasty ceramics. Despite its fame, much about Jun ware remains unclear, and the subject of arguments among experts. Several different types of pottery are covered by the term, produced over several centuries and in several places, during the Northern Song dynasty (960–1127), Jin dynasty (1115–1234) and Yuan dynasty (1271–1368), and (as has become clearer in recent years) lasting into the early Ming dynasty (1368–1644).

Some of the wares were for a popular market, especially the drinking vessels, but others seem to have been made for the imperial court and are known as "official Jun wares"; they are not mentioned in contemporary documents and their dating remains somewhat controversial. These are mostly bowls for growing bulbs or flower-pots with matching stands, such as can be seen in many paintings of scenes in imperial palaces. The consensus that seems to be emerging, driven largely by the interpretation of excavations at kiln sites, divides Jun wares into two groups: a large group of relatively popular wares made in simple shapes from the Northern Song to (at lower quality) the Yuan, and a much rarer group of official Jun wares made at a single site (Juntai) for the imperial palaces in the Yuan and early Ming periods. Both types rely largely for their effect on their use of the blue and purple glaze colours; the latter group are sturdy shapes for relatively low-status uses such as flowerpots and perhaps spitoons.

The most striking and distinctive Jun wares use blue to purple glaze colours, sometimes suffused with white, made with straw ash in the glaze. They often show "splashes" of purple on blue, sometimes appearing as though random, though they are usually planned. A different group are "streaked" purple on blue, the Chinese describing the streaks as "worm-tracks". This is a high-prestige stoneware which was greatly admired and often imitated in later periods. But colours range from a light greenish-brown through green to blue and purple. The shapes are mostly simple, except for the official wares, and other decoration is normally limited to the glaze effects. Most often, the "unofficial" wares are wheel-thrown, but the official ones moulded.

The wares are stoneware in terms of Western classification, and "high-fired" or porcelain in Chinese terms (where the class of stoneware is not generally recognised). Like the still more prestigious Ru ware, they are often not quite fired as high as the normal stoneware temperature range, and the body remains permeable to water. They form a "close relative" of the wider group of Northern celadons or greenwares.

== History ==
Yuan period Jun bowl

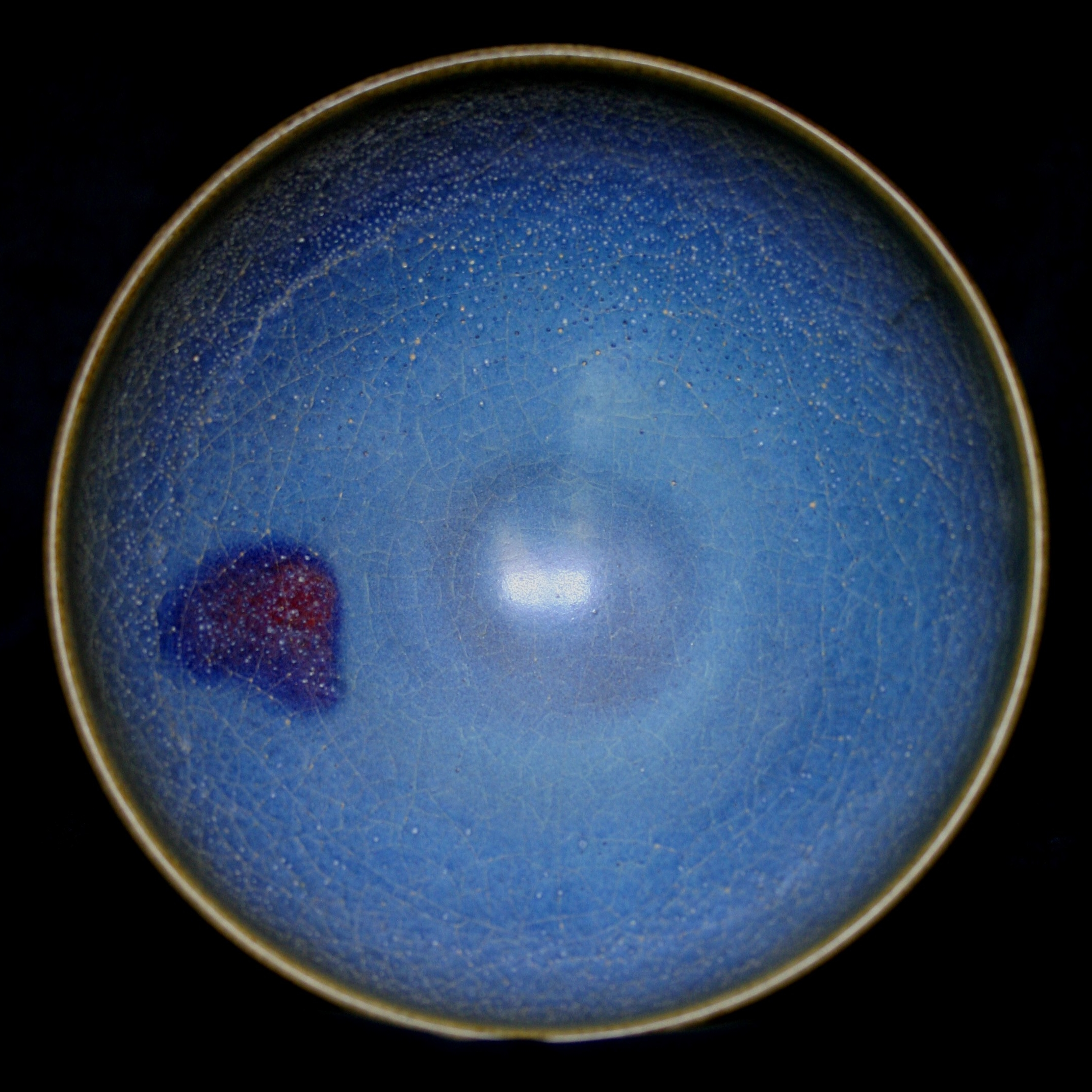
Top view

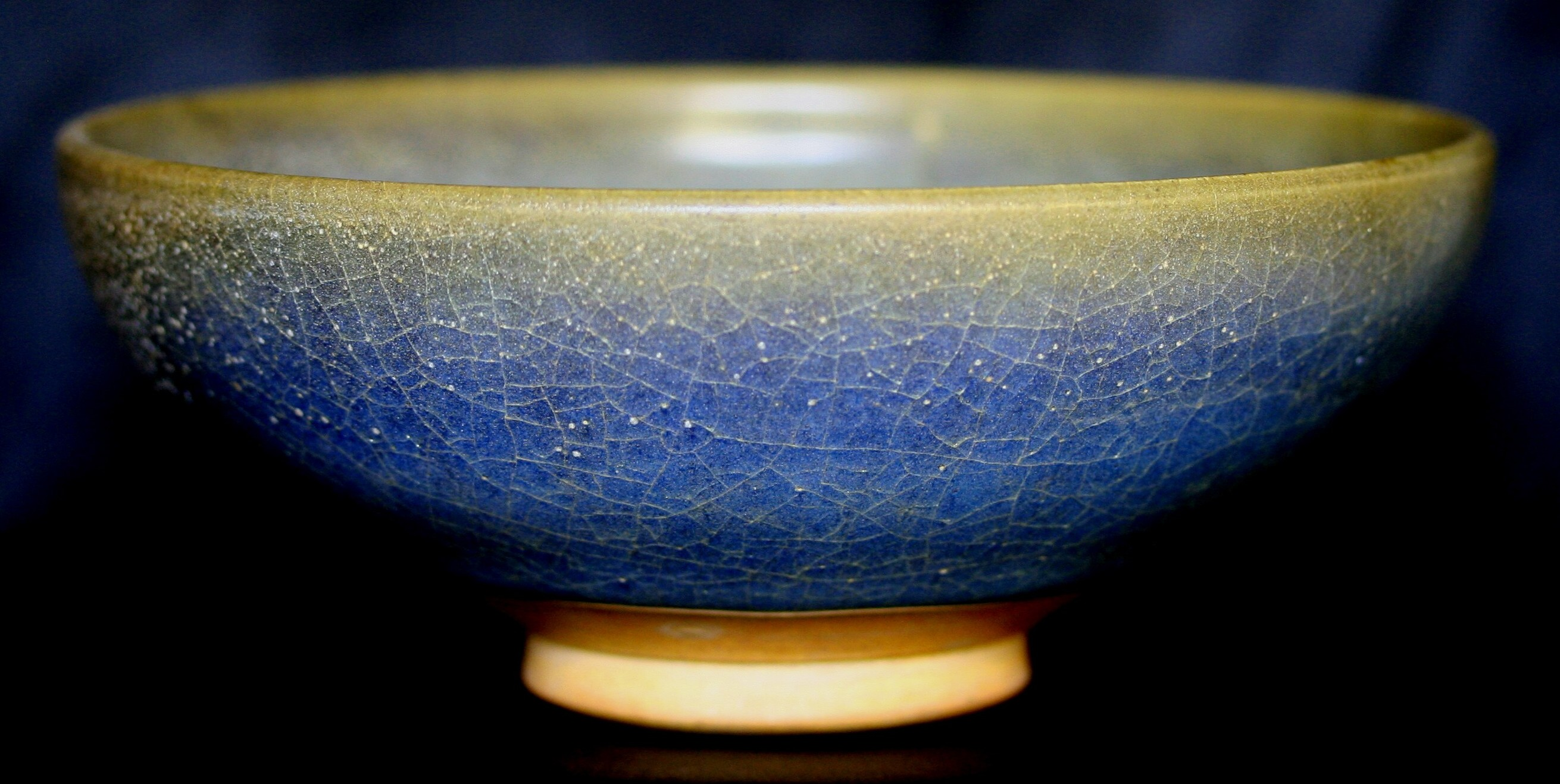
Side view

The start date for Jun ware is uncertain; many pieces are dated to the Song dynasty mainly through the similarity of their shapes to those of other Song wares. No Jun ware has yet been recovered from tombs that can be firmly dated to the Song. The two main sites with kilns producing Jun ware are close to Yuzhou, Henan and in Linru County in Henan though, at least by the Yuan, there were many others, explaining the many differences between examples. As with other wares, excavations at kiln sites in recent decades have shown that other types of pottery were also made at the same sites. One Jun ware site was Qingliangsi, where imperial Ru ware was also made.

The Chinese character for Jun became incorporated in local place names only as late as 1368. There is no mention of the kilns of Jun ware in written sources from the Song to Yuan dynasties. The first mention of the wares is by the painter Song Xu, writing in 1504, in his 宋氏家規部; Song shi jia guibu; "Song family customs". A black ware with spots was produced at the Xiaobai Valley in the Tang dynasty and can be considered the precursor of Jun ware.

It is possible that early pieces in a very light blue are actually the quasi-mythical Chai ware of the 10th century, much praised in early sources, but of which no clear examples matching the early descriptions survive.

The purple colour perhaps does not appear until the early 12th century, and then is only controlled by late in that century. By the late 13th century at least one piece has a character formed in splashes. This is a headrest in the Metropolitan Museum of Art with the character for "pillow".

The ware experiences a fall in quality into the Jin period, continuing in the Yuan. By the Yuan dynasty, Jun ware production had spread to other kiln sites in Henan, Hebei and Shanxi provinces, although Yuzhou City was the prime area for Jun ware production. Some fine quality pieces are known, often a good deal larger than previously. Investigations of Jun ware kiln sites began in 1951 under Chen Wanli of the Palace Museum. A hundred kiln sites were subsequently discovered. A major report appeared in the journal Wenwu ("Historical Relics") in 1964. It was excavations at Juntai in 1973–1974 which revealed the site where official Jun was made; it is assumed this was all made there.

== Characteristics ==
The Jun glaze included blue-grey, sky-blue, moon-white, red and purple, the most prized have crimson or purple splashes. Varying the temperature of the kilns changed colour tints, a technique known as yaobian.

=== General Jun ware ===
A variety of simple shapes are made, the range mostly similar to that of the very differently decorated Cizhou ware. Like Cizhou wares, the walls are thick and sturdy. Most are natural wheel-formed bowls and dishes, and small vases or wine-carafes, mostly with a narrow neck, but some meipings. There are also boxes, jars, ewers and other shapes.

The foot of the later period ware is usually unglazed and brown; the rim of bowls can also be brown or greenish where the glaze is thinner. Song period examples display a careful finishing with glaze inside the foot. Naturally Song shapes are crisp and thinner than later Jin and Yuan examples. All types are thickly glazed, often with the glaze not reaching the foot of the piece.

The flower-like ("foliated") rims found in official Jun began in some Song pieces, and echoed contemporary styles in metalwork and lacquer. By the Yuan some shapes, such as vases and circular incense-burners, are given handles.

Vases

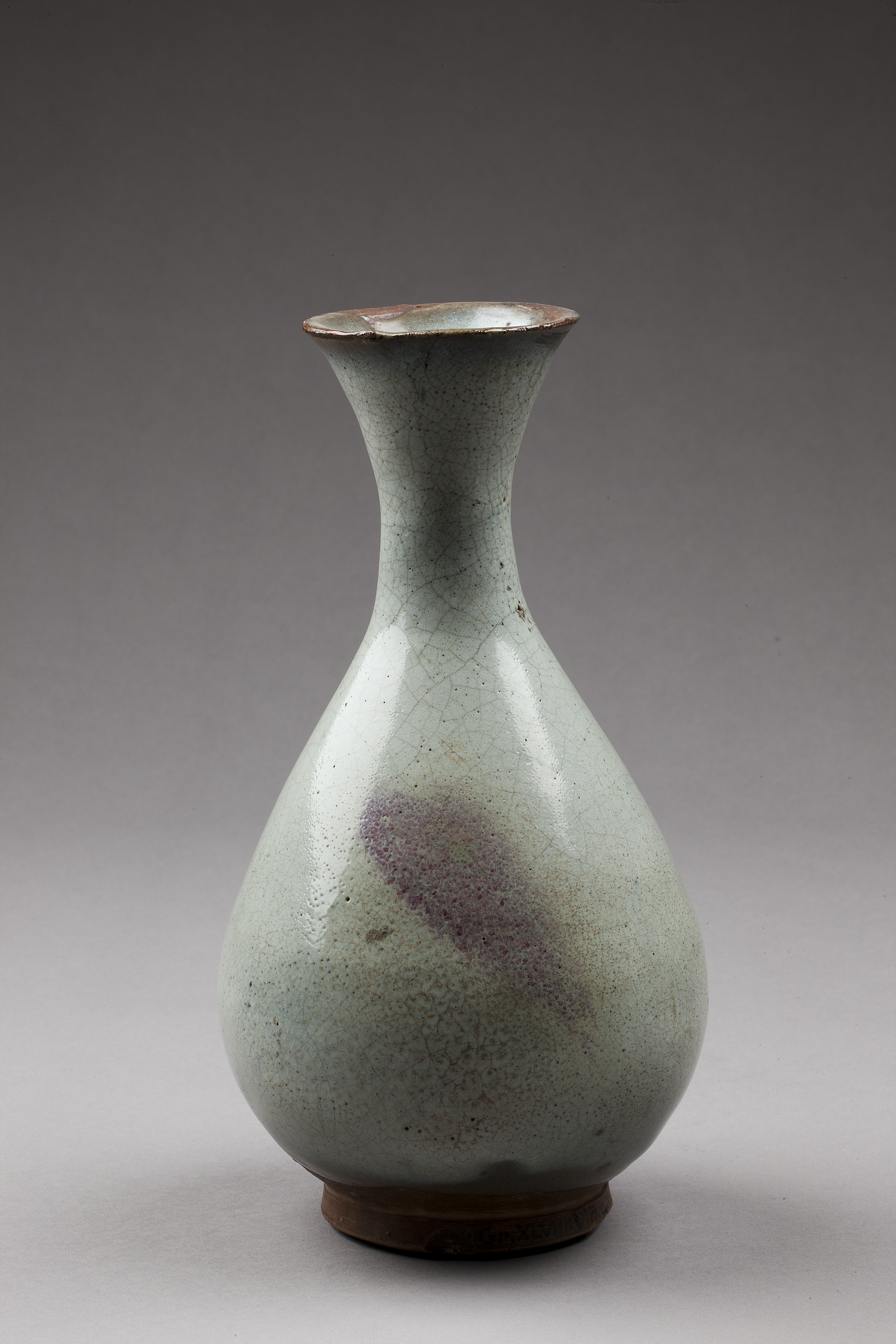
Vase with purple splashes, late Song or early Yuan dynasty

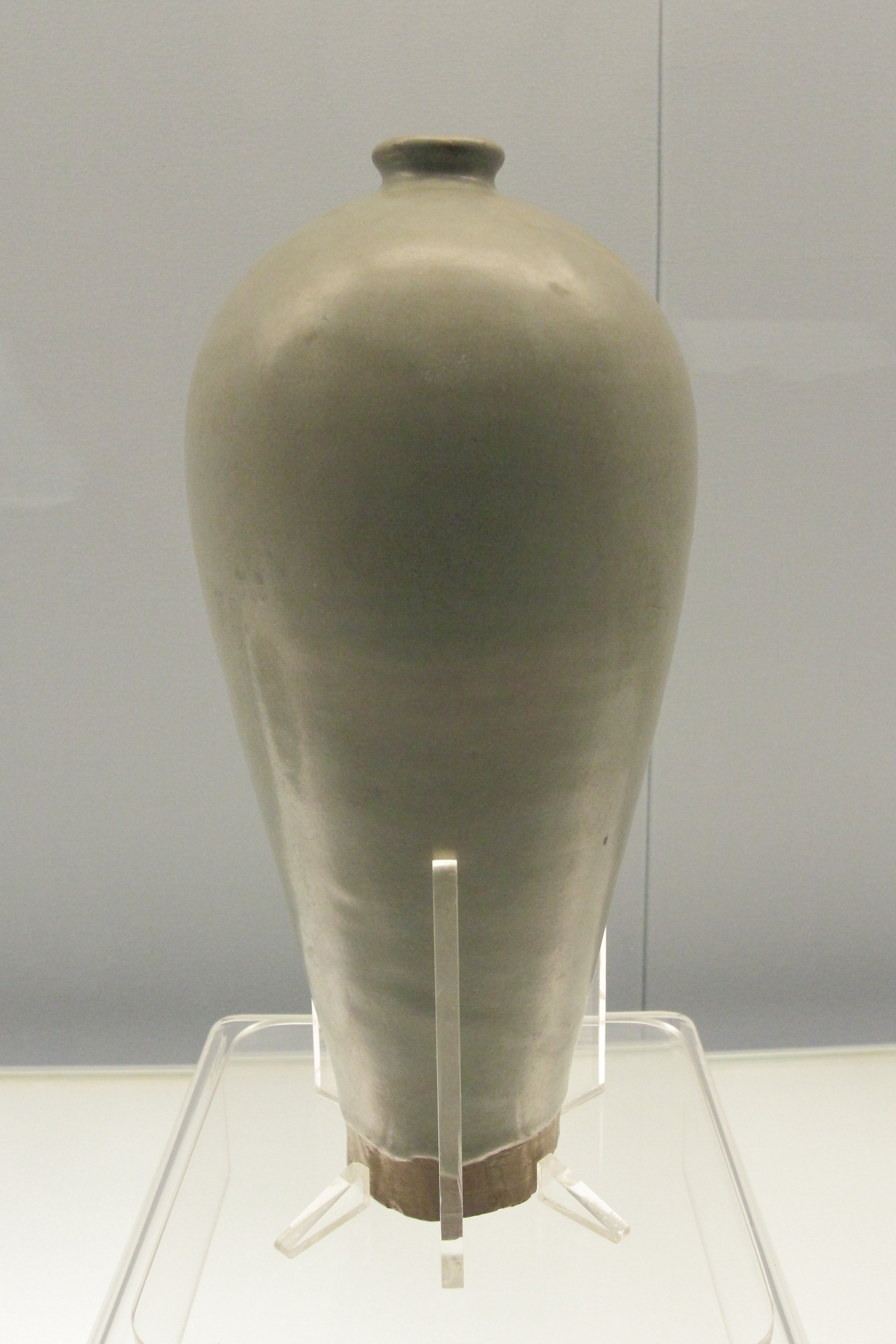
Moon-white glazed meiping vase, southern Song

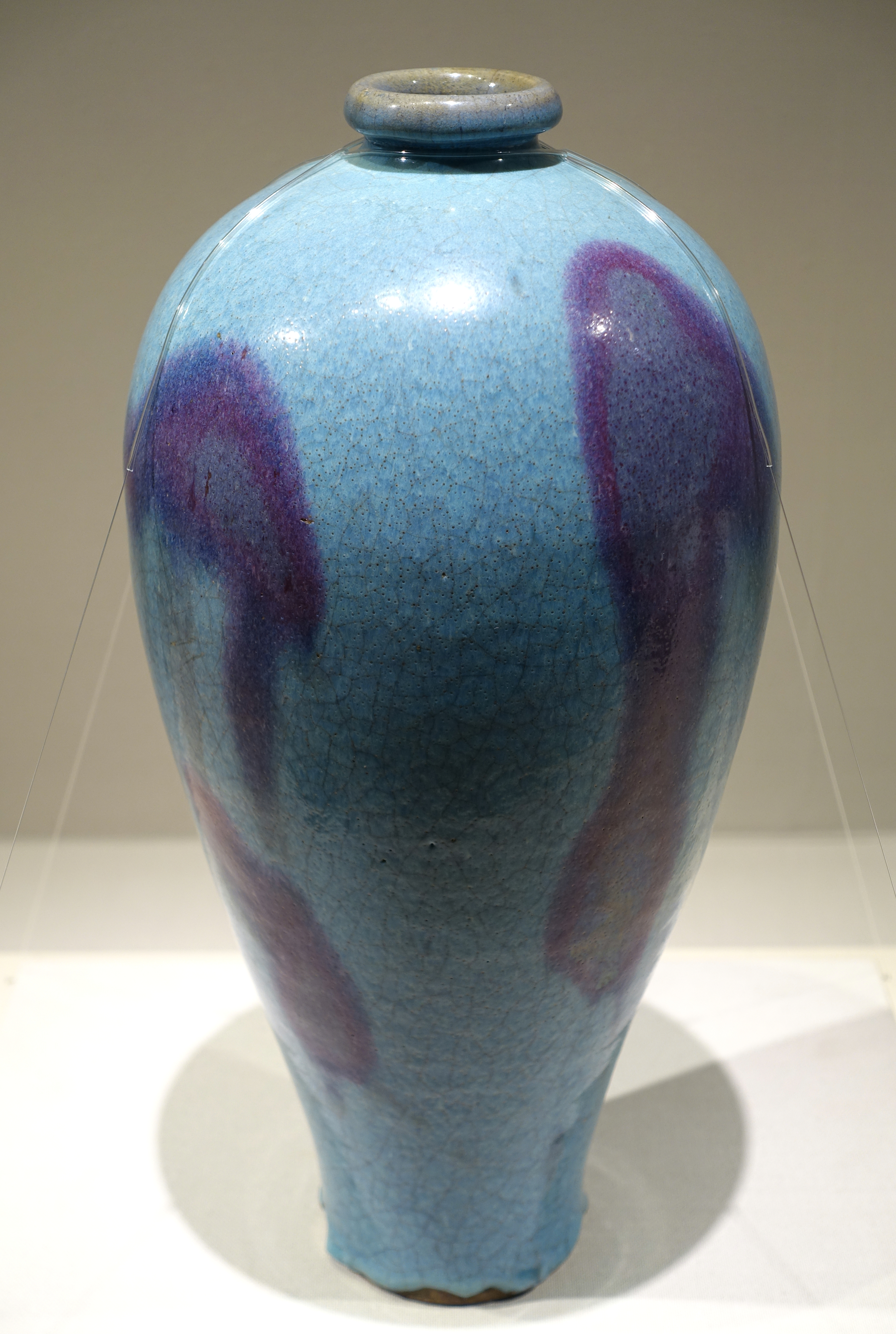
Vase with purple splashes, late Jin or early Yuan

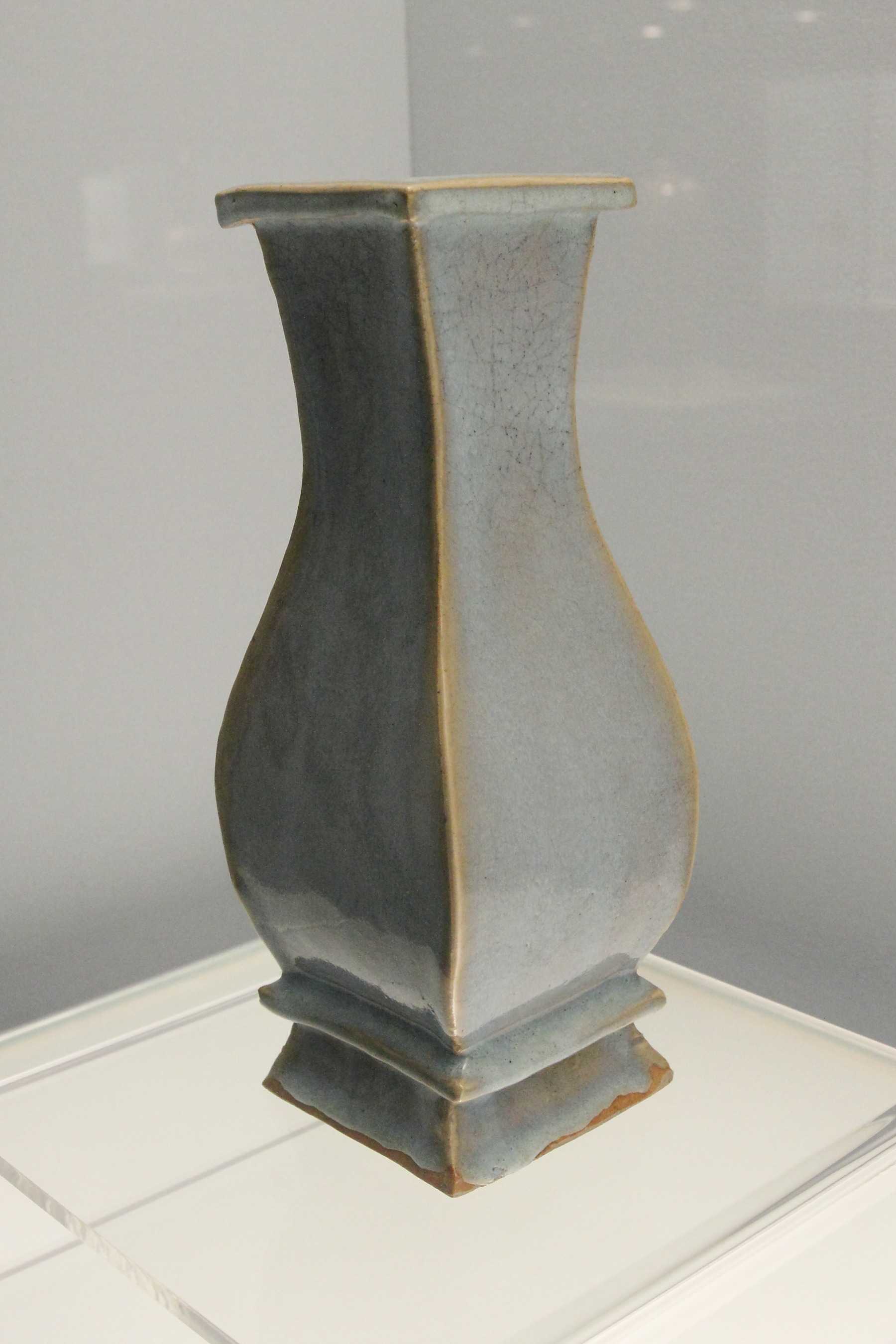
Sky-blue glazed square vase, Yuan

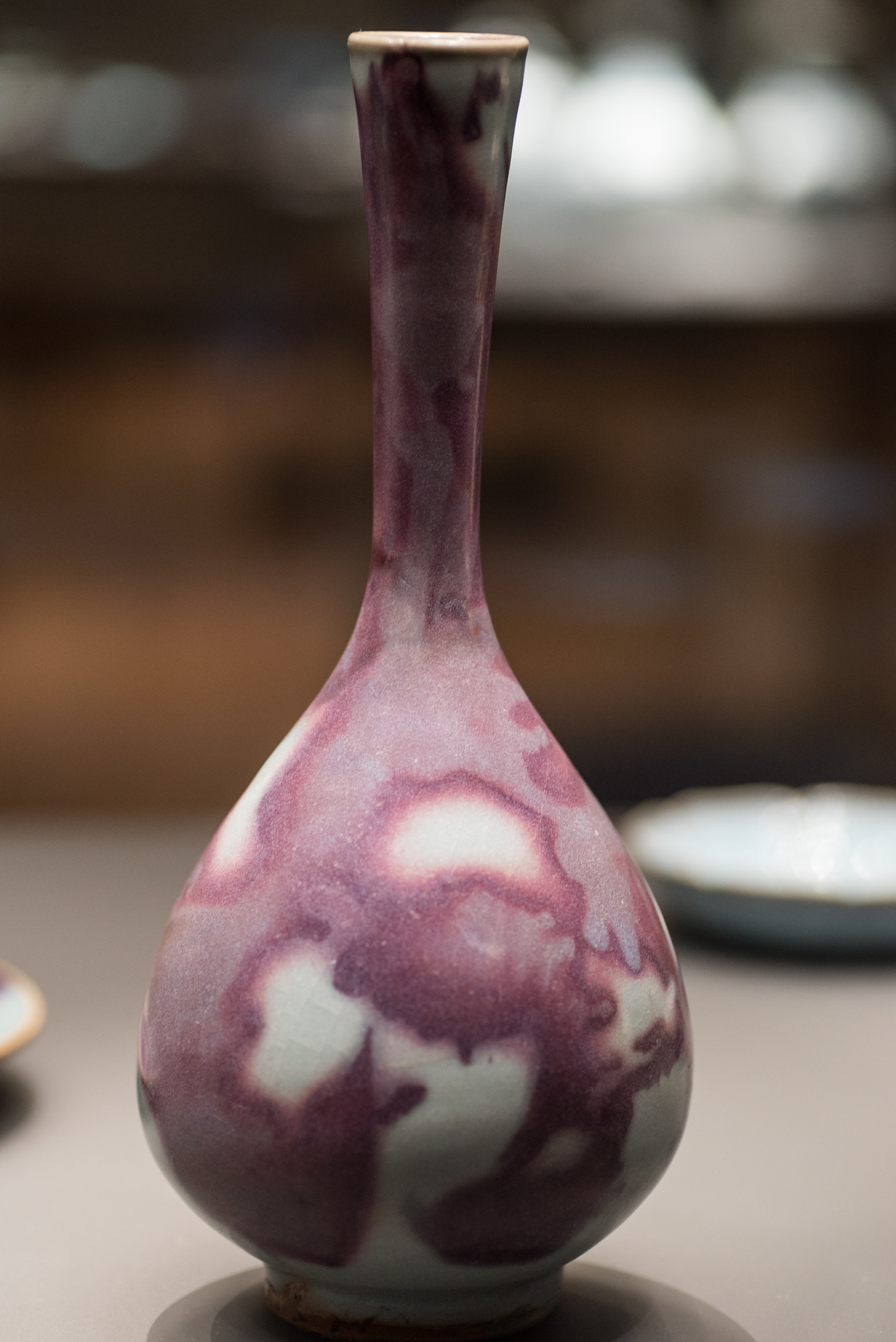
Jun vase, British Museum.

Cups

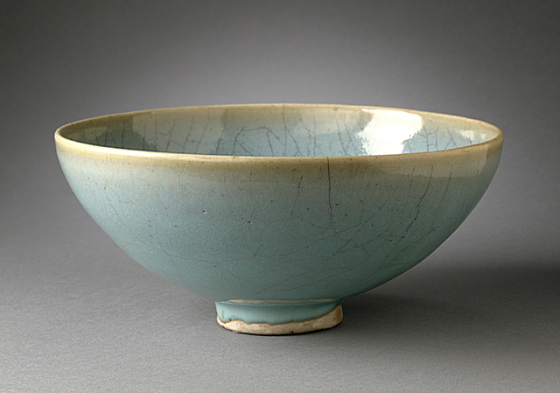
Yuan

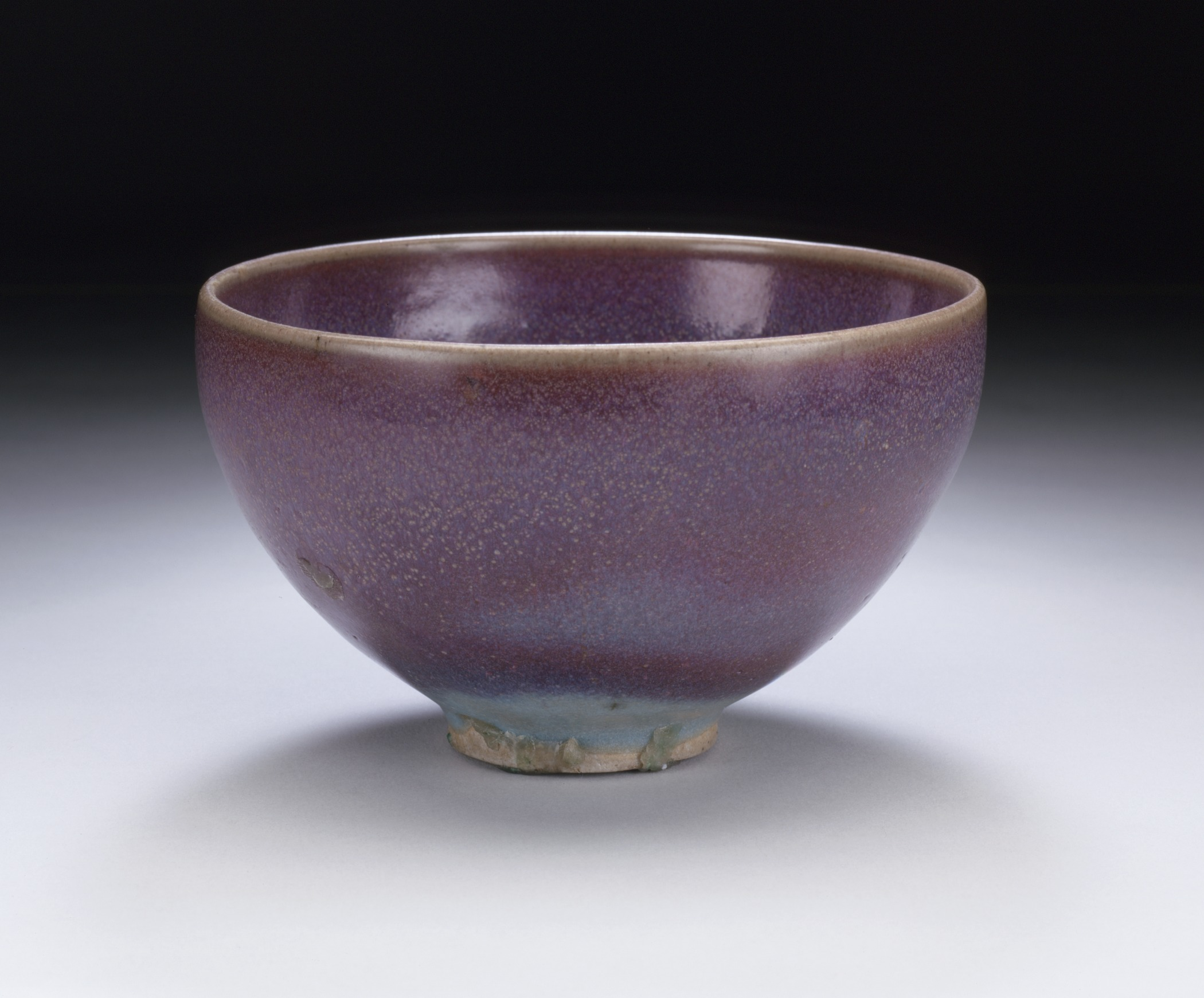
12th century

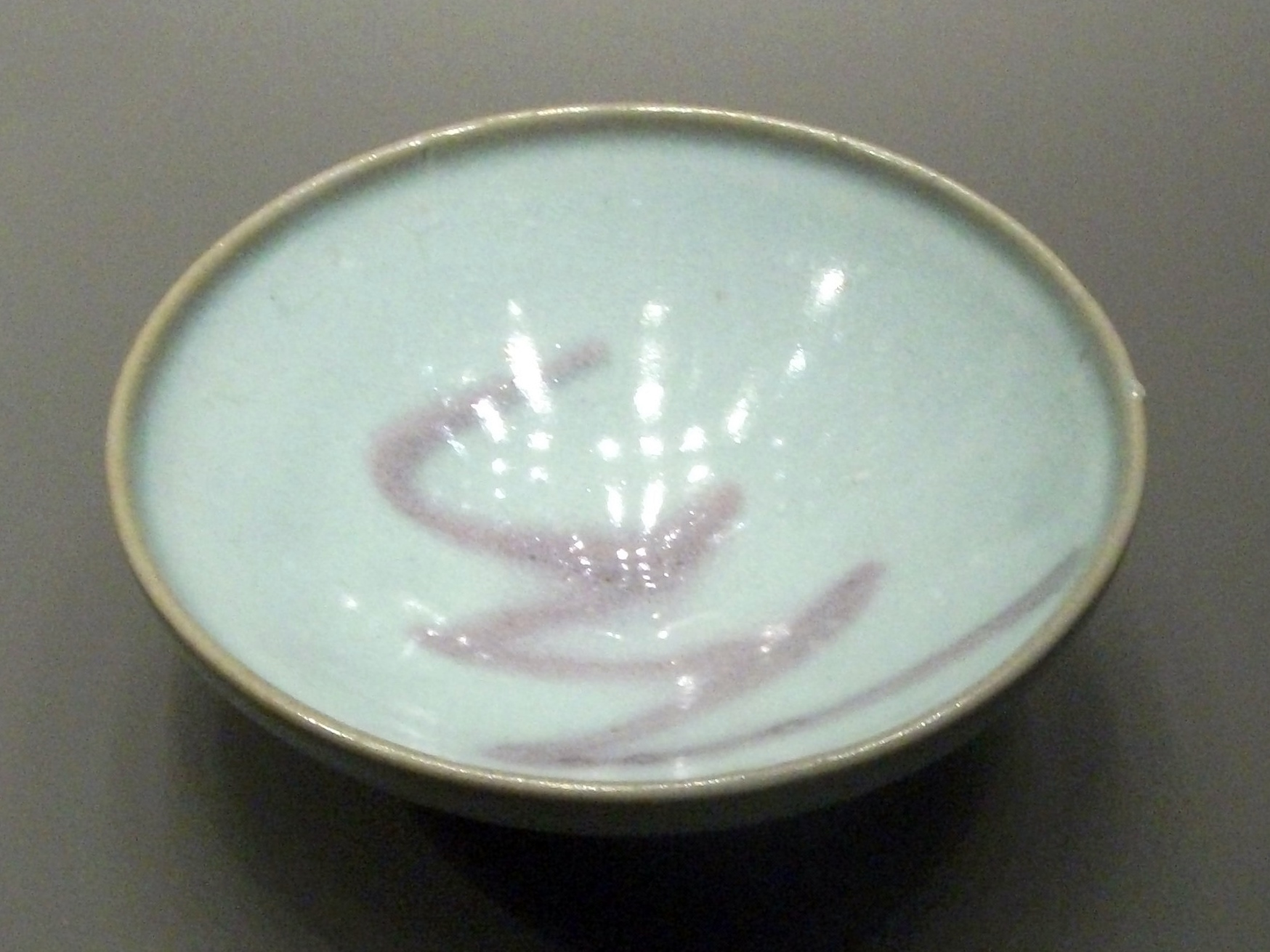

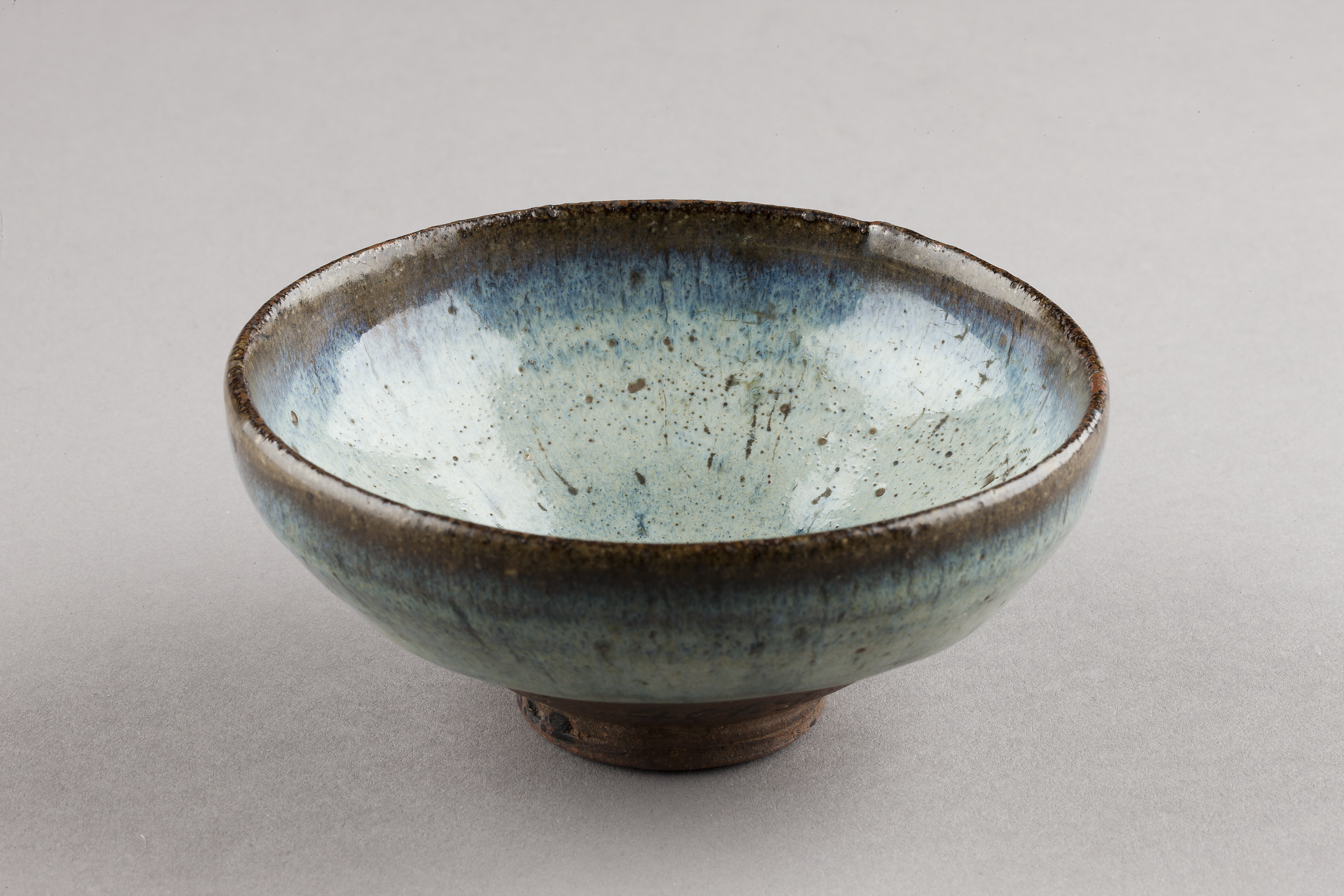
Song

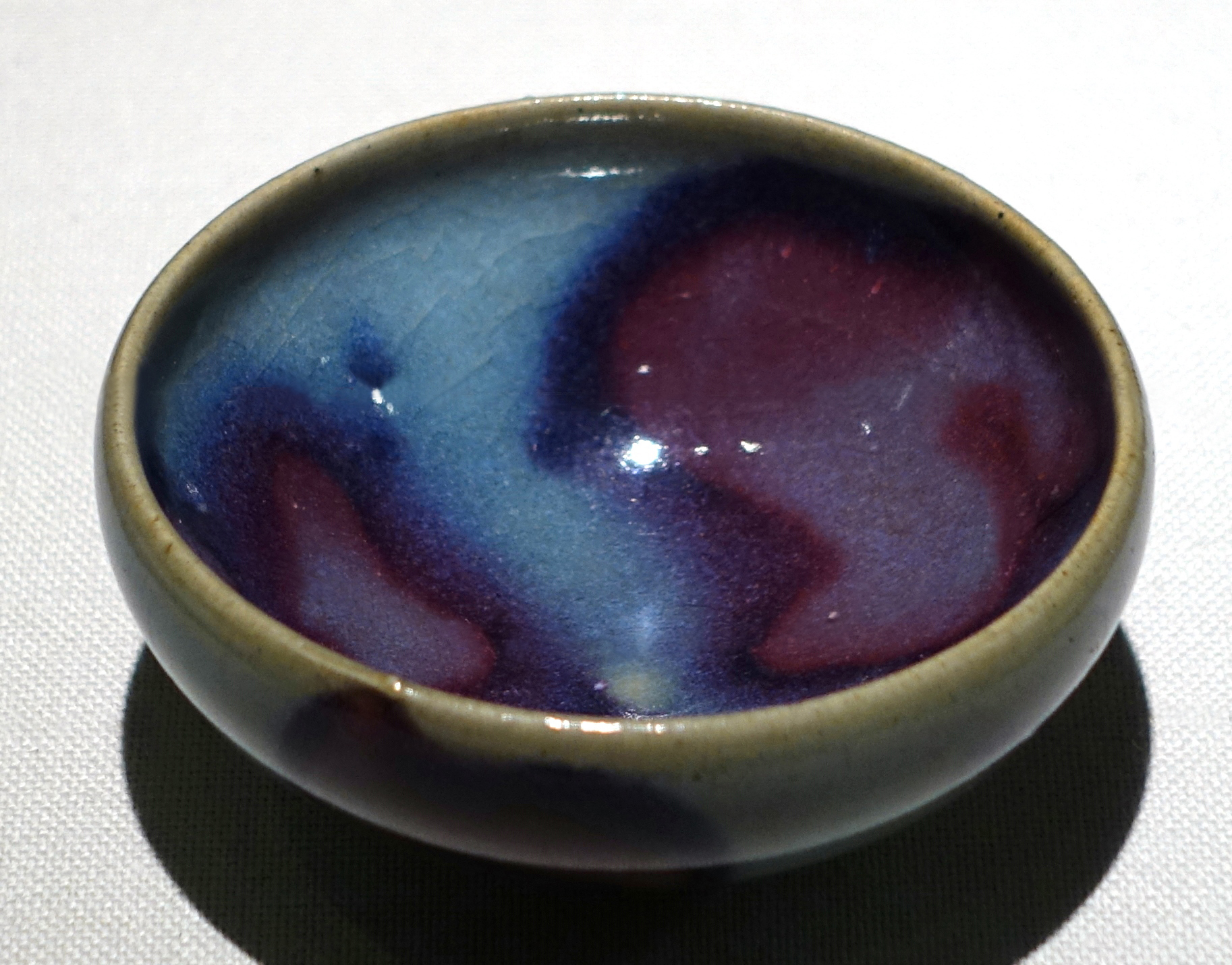
Wine cup, opaque bluish glaze with purple-red splashes, late Jin or early Yuan dynasty, 12th–13th century

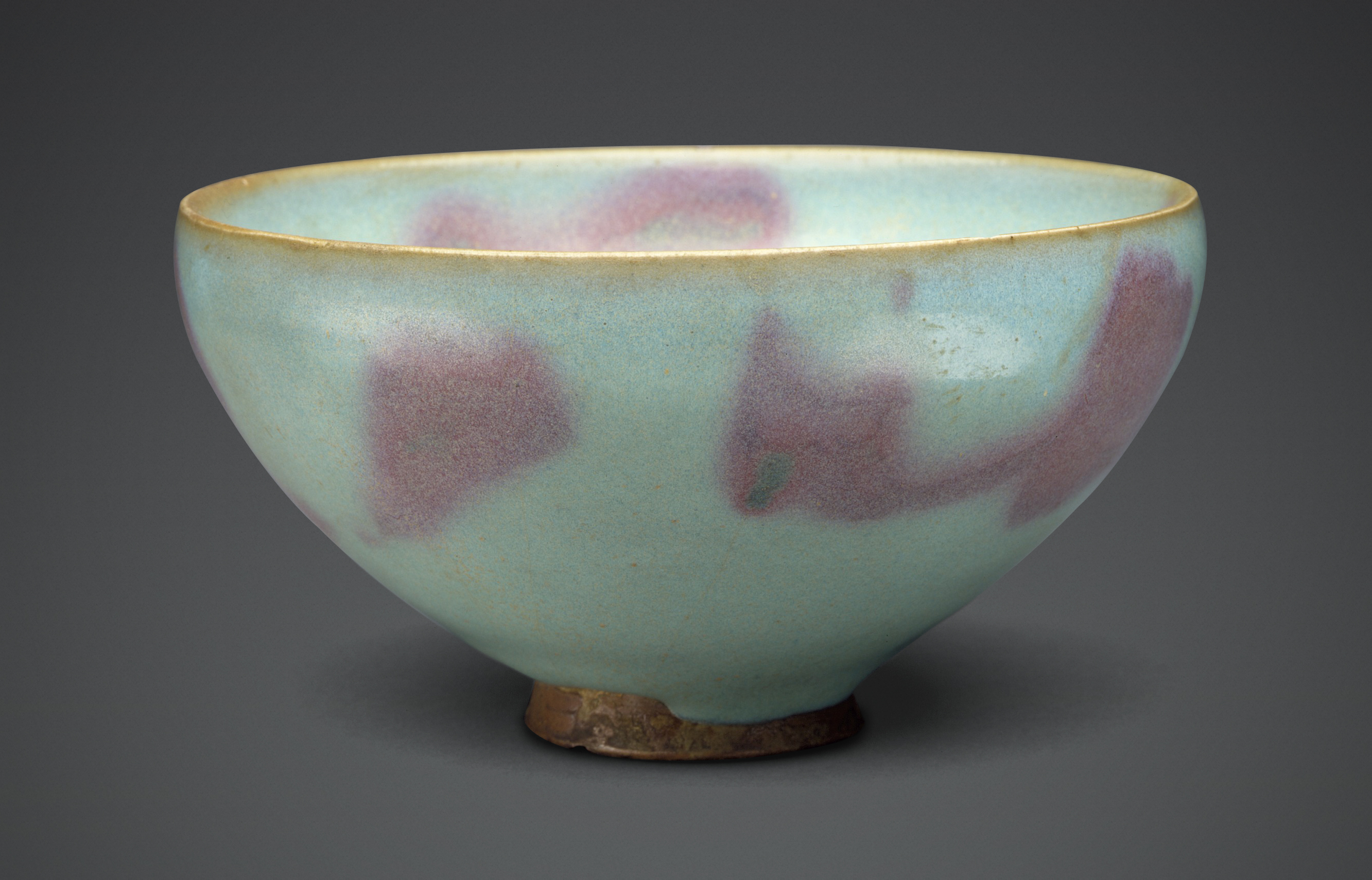
Jun wheel-thrown stoneware bowl with blue glaze and purple splashes, Jin dynasty, 1127–1234

=== "Official" Jun ware ===
Although Jun ware is not mentioned by Song writers on ceramics (or in surviving chronicles), at least the last class mentioned above, of "streaked" purple on blue, appears to have been made for the court, and is known as "official" (guan) Jun ware. The streaked pieces are "all of shapes designed for the growing or display of flowers", according to Shelagh Vainker, though other functions are sometimes suggested, giving alternatives such as spitoon/flower-pots, brush-washer/flower pot stand/bulb planters, and so on. As an example, the pot illustrated in the Walters Art Museum, Baltimore is described by them as a "spitoon", but an identical shape in the Percival David Collection is described as a "flower-pot", with an inscribed "6" underneath. Very similar pots are shown with plants growing in them in a Ming imperial portrait. The Walters are cautious on dating, while the British Museum date their piece to 1403–1435, in the early Ming.

The sizes and shapes differ from the other groups, being generally larger, heavier, and with more complicated shapes, made in double (two-part) moulds in a process apparently invented by the potters of Jun ware. Many of the rims are irregular, forming flower-like shapes. There are also incisions on the bases of many pieces, of the characters feng hua, the name of a building in the main Song palace at Kaifeng (in at least one case this is a Qing addition). Other pieces have numbers between one and ten impressed on the base. These may indicate standard sizes to help the palace in ordering, the most likely explanation, or members of matching sets. If the numbers indicate sizes, "1" is the largest and "10" the smallest". Such pieces are sometimes called "numbered Jun ware". There are also some simple table shapes made to the same quality, but these are never numbered.

There has been a divergence between Asian and Western scholars in dating these; the Chinese, relying largely on evidence from excavations at the Juntai kiln, place them in the late Northern Song, while Western writers put them in the Yuan or early Ming. There has been much discussion of a single supposedly Song period coin found in a kiln at Juntai. There seem at the least to have been replacement orders for the new imperial palace in Beijing under the early Ming (Yongle and Xuande Emperors, so 1402–1435), and many pieces are inscribed with locations, probably added in the 18th century, and certainly remained in place in the palace until the late Qing. Jun flower pots can also be seen in paintings of the court from the Ming. The British Museum dates the official wares "from about AD 1368 to 1435".

Sherds of these have been excavated at the kiln site at Juntai, Yixian, and recently, opinion has been shifting in favour of earlier dating within the Ming (as followed above), and some pieces have been reassigned from being "Jun-type" imitations in Jingdezhen ware, to Jun itself. The body material of official Jun ware seems rather different from that of the earlier and more popular pieces.

Flat, wide shapes (functions and dates as per the owning museums)

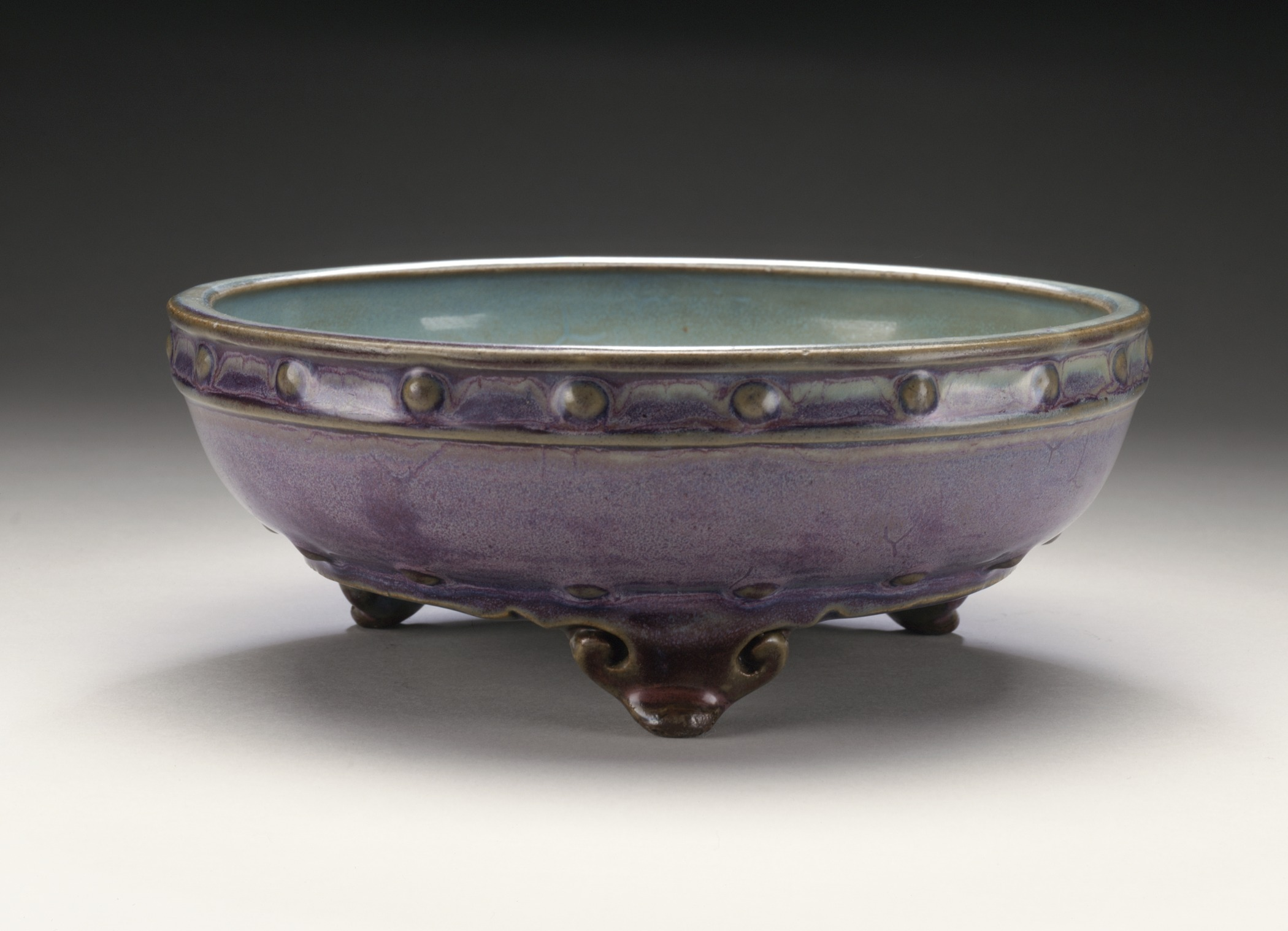
Bulb Bowl, about 1200–1300

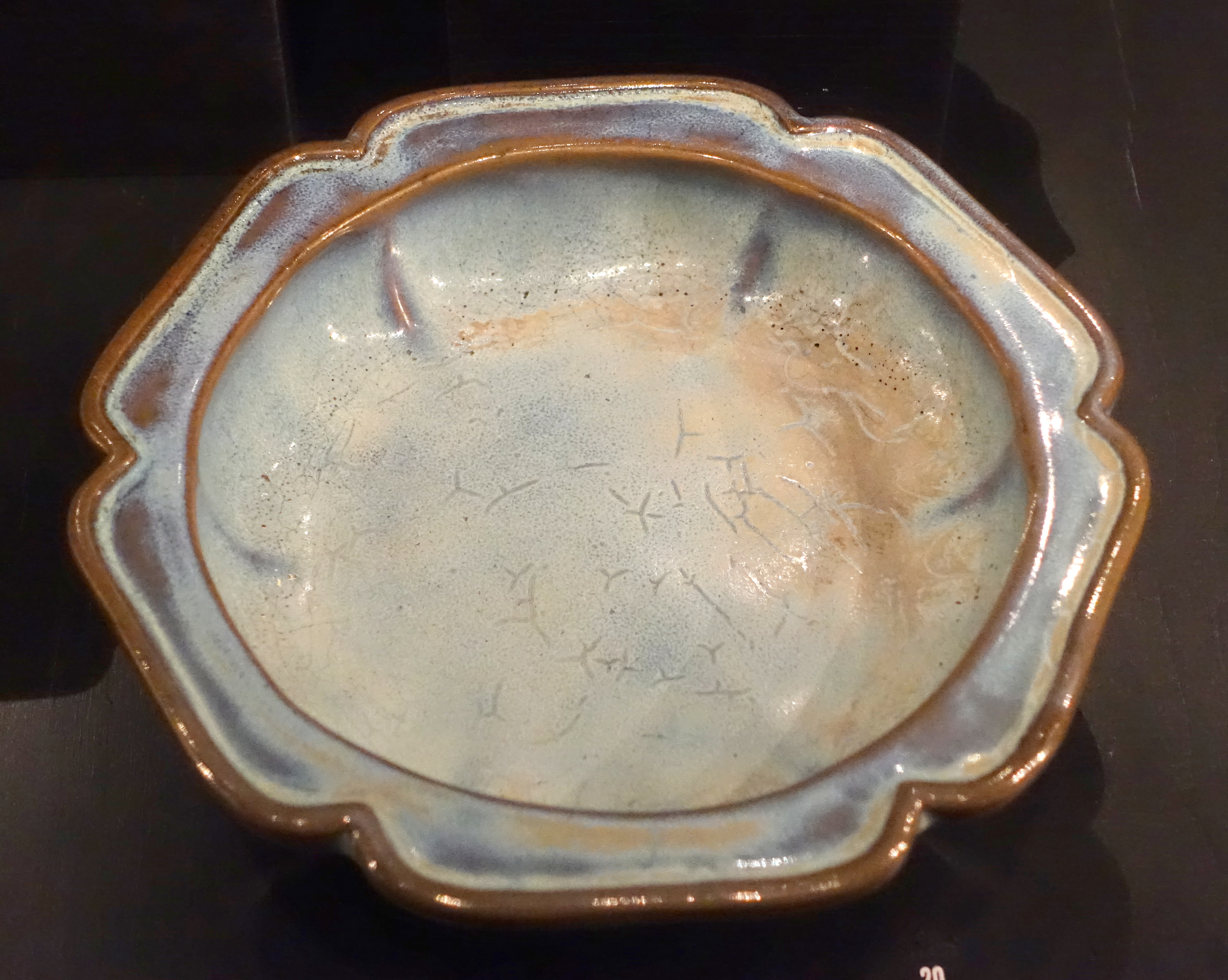
"Bowl with ruyi-shaped legs" (museum dates to Song)

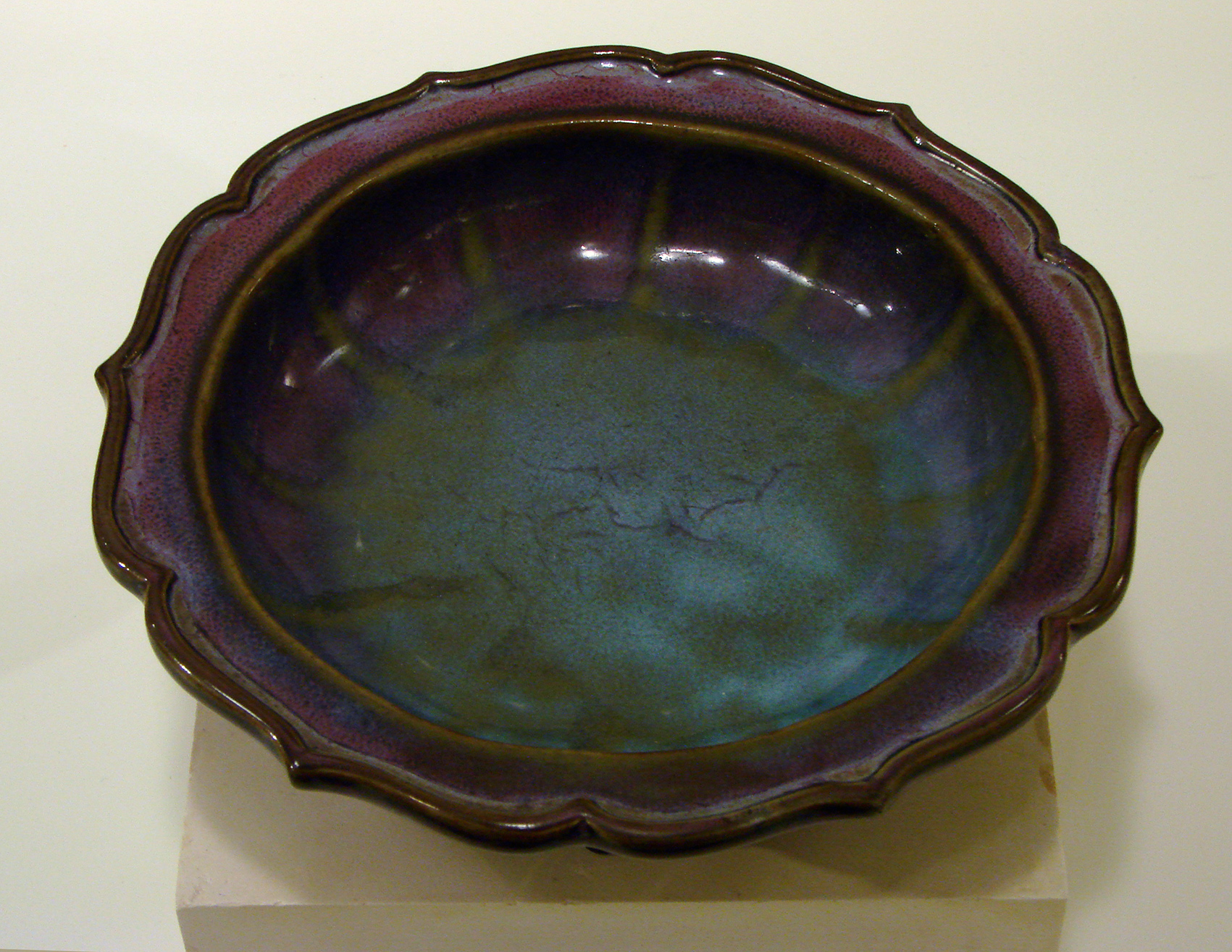
Bowl (museum dates to 13th–14th century)

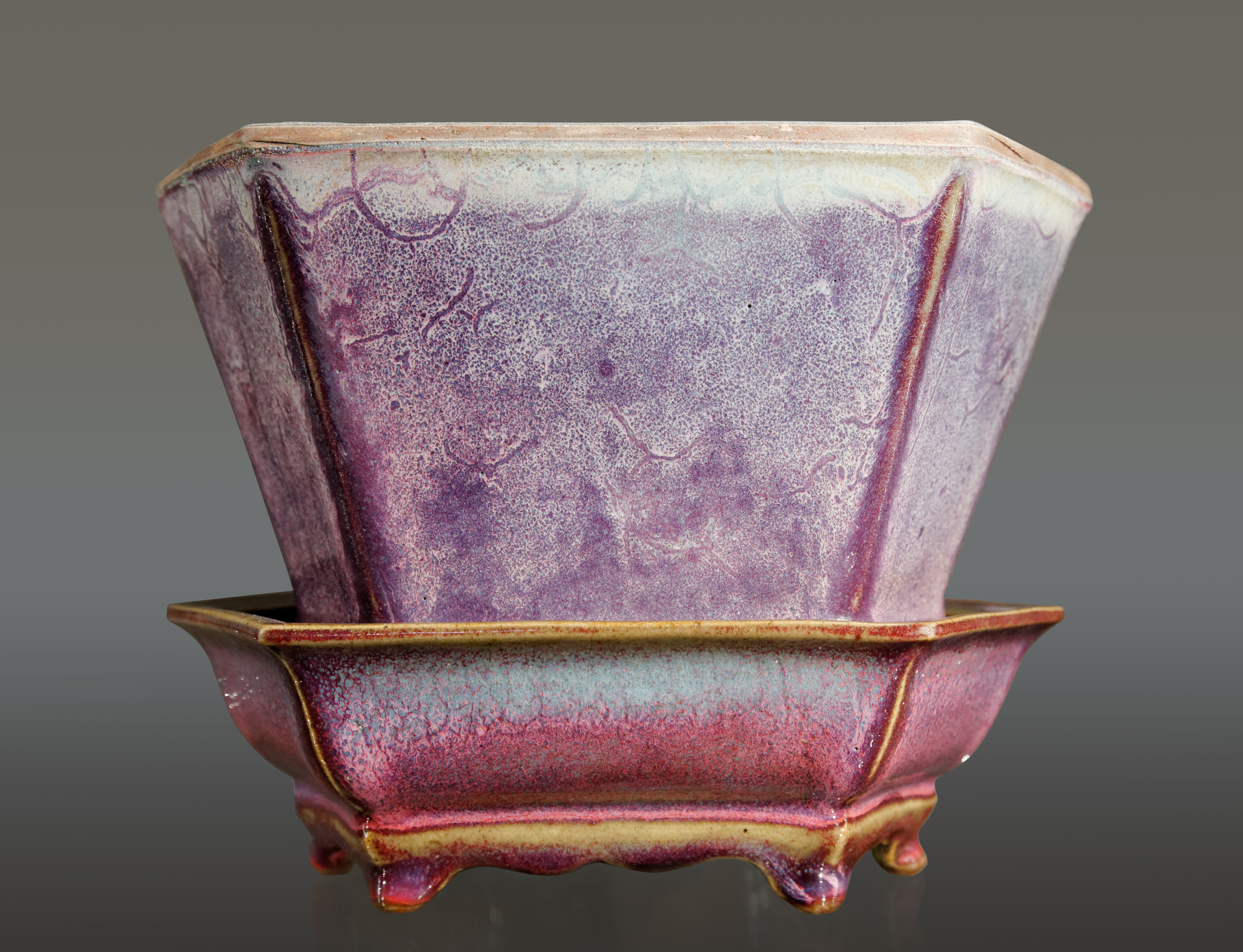
Official Jun "streaked" hexagonal flowerpot and stand, Ming dynasty, 1400–1435

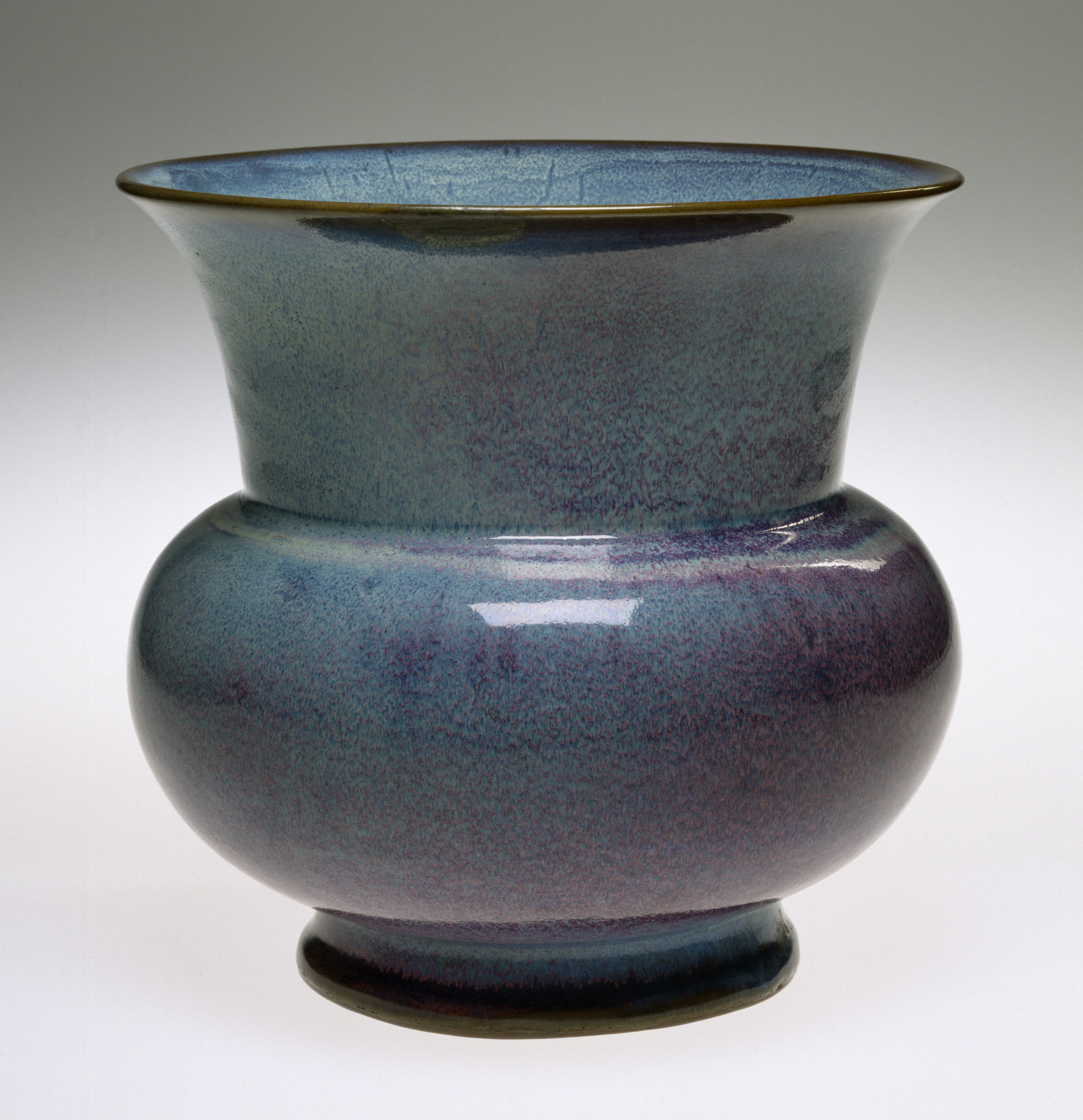
"Official" spittoon or flower-pot; Yuan or Ming, see text

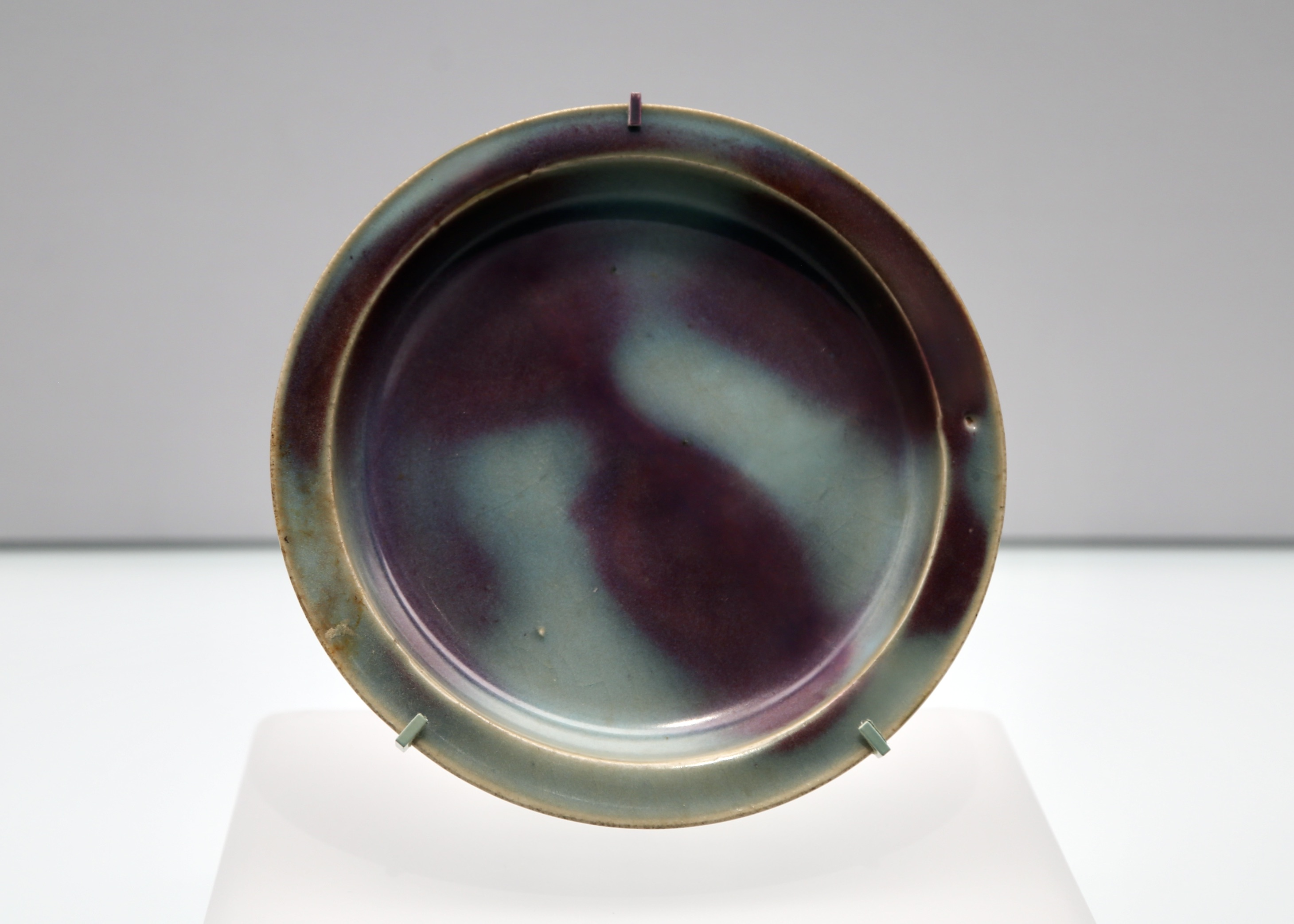
Jun ware dish with sky-blue glaze and purple splashes, Jin dynasty. Shanghai Museum.

== Technical aspects of the glaze and firing ==
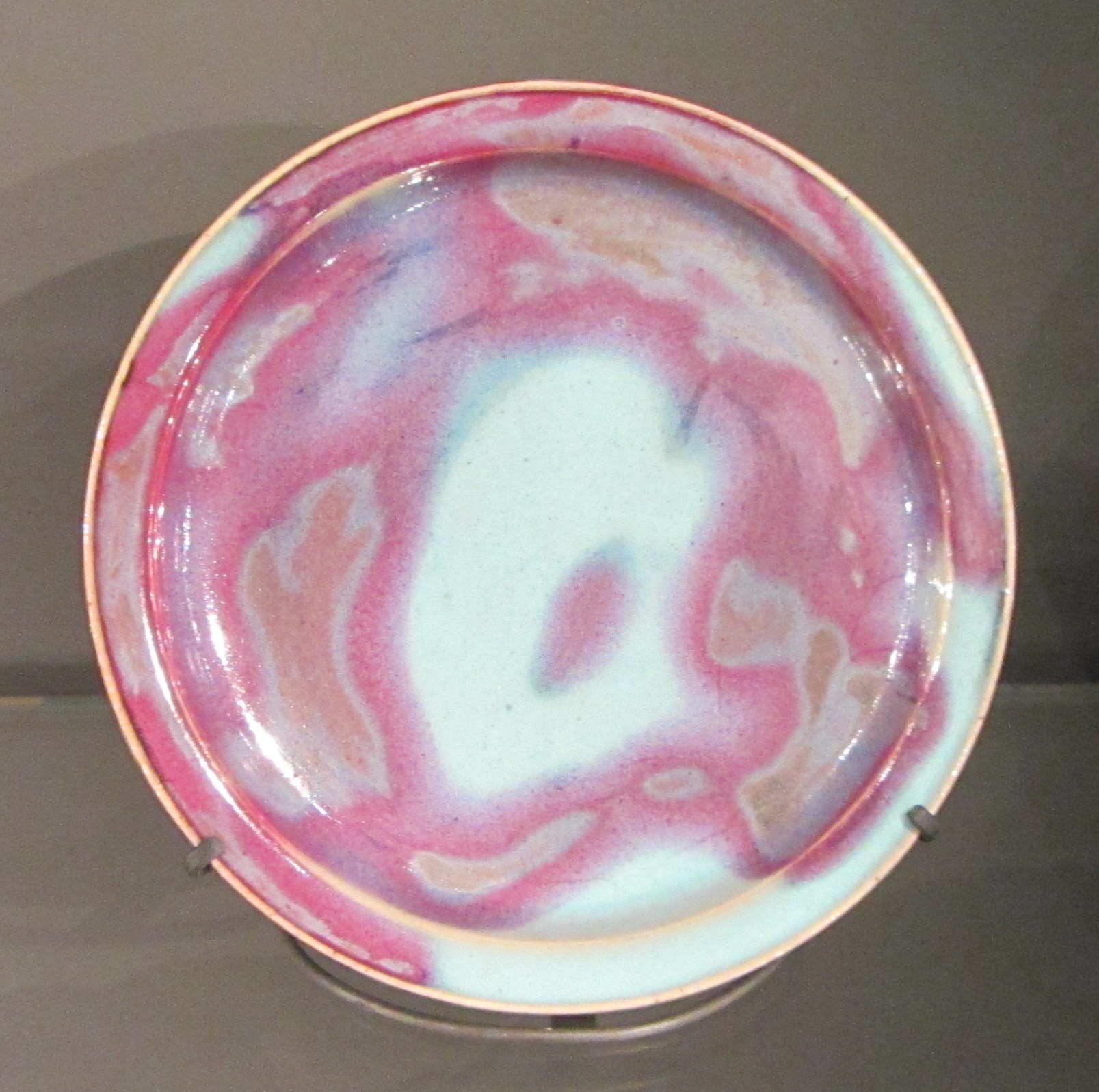
Dish with opalescent blue and lavender splashed glazes, Jin dynasty (1115–1234)

The glaze of Jun ware is always thick and opaque. It is often very thin or absent around the rim, but thick at the foot, where it typically leaves a small part uncovered. Both the light blue and purple colours are first seen in Chinese pottery in Jun wares. The purple areas are caused by the addition of a solution including copper splashed or painted onto the body between glazing and firing. Some blue or green comes from iron oxide in the glaze, combined with firing in a reducing atmosphere. At high temperature the glaze produced "spontaneous unmixing ... into silica-rich and lime-rich glasses", which through phase separation gives an opalescent final appearance: "The tiny spherules of lime-rich glass scatter blue light, producing a strong bluish cast". The fact that particles or inhomogeneities smaller than a light wavelength preferentially scatter blue light is known as Rayleigh scattering. The glaze contains large numbers of tiny bubbles, from gases produced in the glaze during firing. These, though invisible to the naked eye, contribute to the visual effect of the pieces. In many pieces they leave the glaze rather rough to the touch, though the finest pieces avoid this, perhaps by grinding the materials very finely. Applying more than one layer of glaze appears to have been common.

Some pieces, especially those of the best quality, seem to have been fired twice, once before glazing, with a second firing at a higher temperature after glazing. The firing with the glaze on needed to reach about 1,200 °C (2,190 °F), and to cool slowly, so that the whole firing process probably took some days. Pieces were placed in individual saggars in the kiln. From excavations, it appears that both wood and coal (which have different effects on the reduction atmosphere) might be used, perhaps with wood used for the best quality pieces.

== Imitations and collecting ==
Jun ware was one of the antique wares that were copied in the south of China in Jingdezhen ware under the Qing dynasty, mostly in the 18th century. In the 19th century there were imitations of Jun glazes in Shiwan ware, also in the south. Modern reproductions, using slipcasting, are still made in the ware's native Henan, though "the rate of wastage is high" and the results less successful than other modern Chinese replica wares.

Although in the Song and Yuan dynasties the wares do not seem to have had a very high status, from the Ming onwards they acquired a very high reputation among collectors. A set of panels in the Walters Art Museum, Baltimore shows the prestige of Jun ware among Chinese collectors under the Qing. Sherds of purple-splashed Jun ware were framed and mounted in a set of four custom-made wooden panels of the 18th or 19th century, seen through individually shaped windows.

Genuine Jun ware continues to be highly collectable and expensive. At an auction at Christie's New York in 2016, prices realized included US$52,500 for a small blue bowl, US$112,500 for a blue plate splashed with purple, and US$389,000 for a round official Jun "Number 3" jardinière.
