= Dabao =

Dabao may refer to:

- Da Bao, a large Chinese steamed bun
- Dabao (打包), a Chinese loanword for take-out

== Places ==
- Dabao, Hebei (大堡镇), a town in Zhuolu County, Hebei
- Dabao, Gansu (大堡镇), a town in Kang County, Gansu
- Dabao, Sichuan (大堡镇), a town in Ebian Yi Autonomous County, Sichuan

== Historical eras ==
- Dabao (大寶, 550–551), era name used by Emperor Jianwen of Liang
- Dabao (大寶, 958–971), era name used by Liu Chang (Southern Han)
