= Anagama kiln =

Ancient type of pottery kiln

Schematic drawing of an Anagama kiln: 1 Door about 75 centimetres (30 in) wide 2 Firebox 3 Stacking floor made of silica sand 4 Dampers 5 Flue 6 Chimney 7 Refractory arch

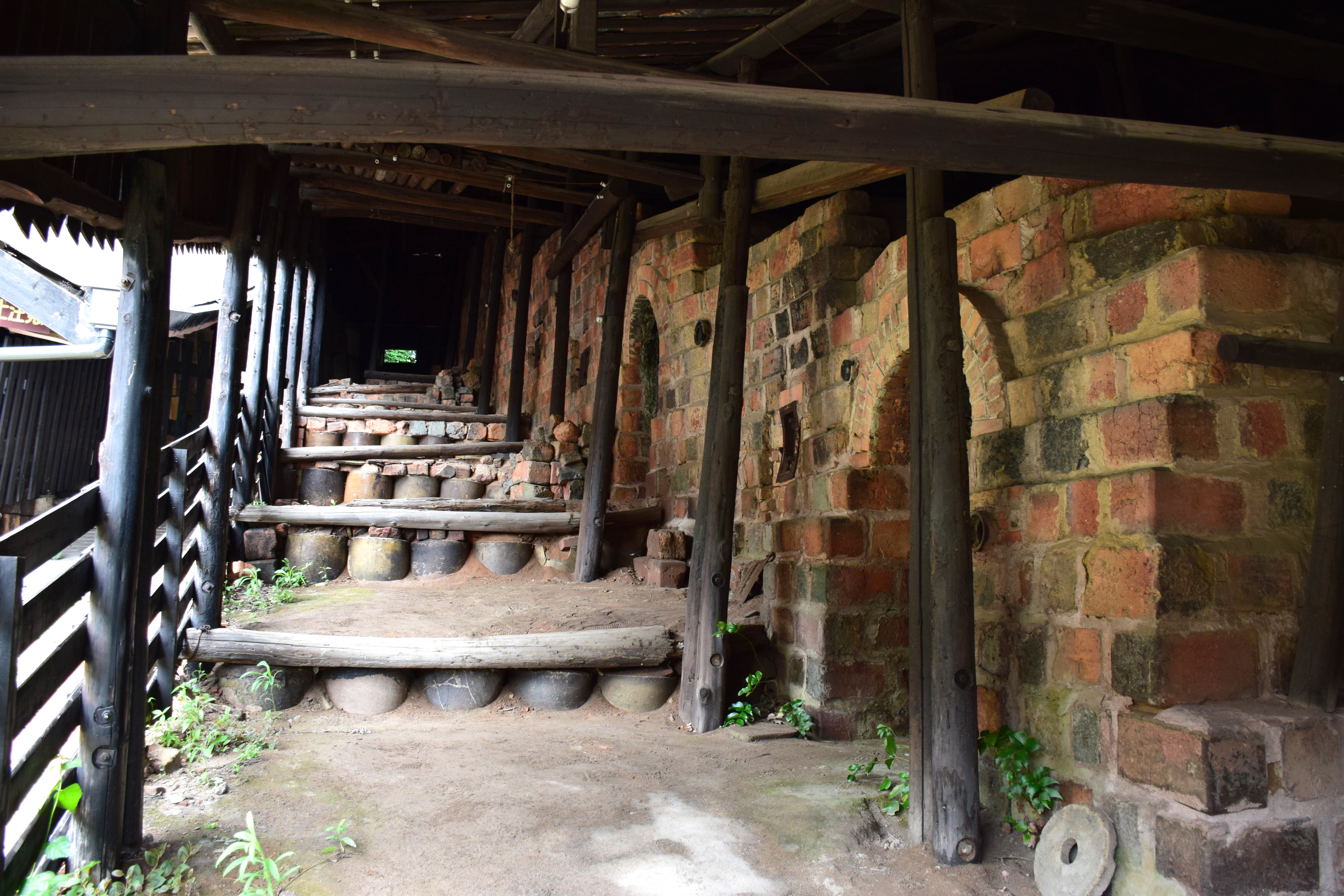
Noborigama in Tokoname, Aichi

A noborigama

Kiln in Shigaraki

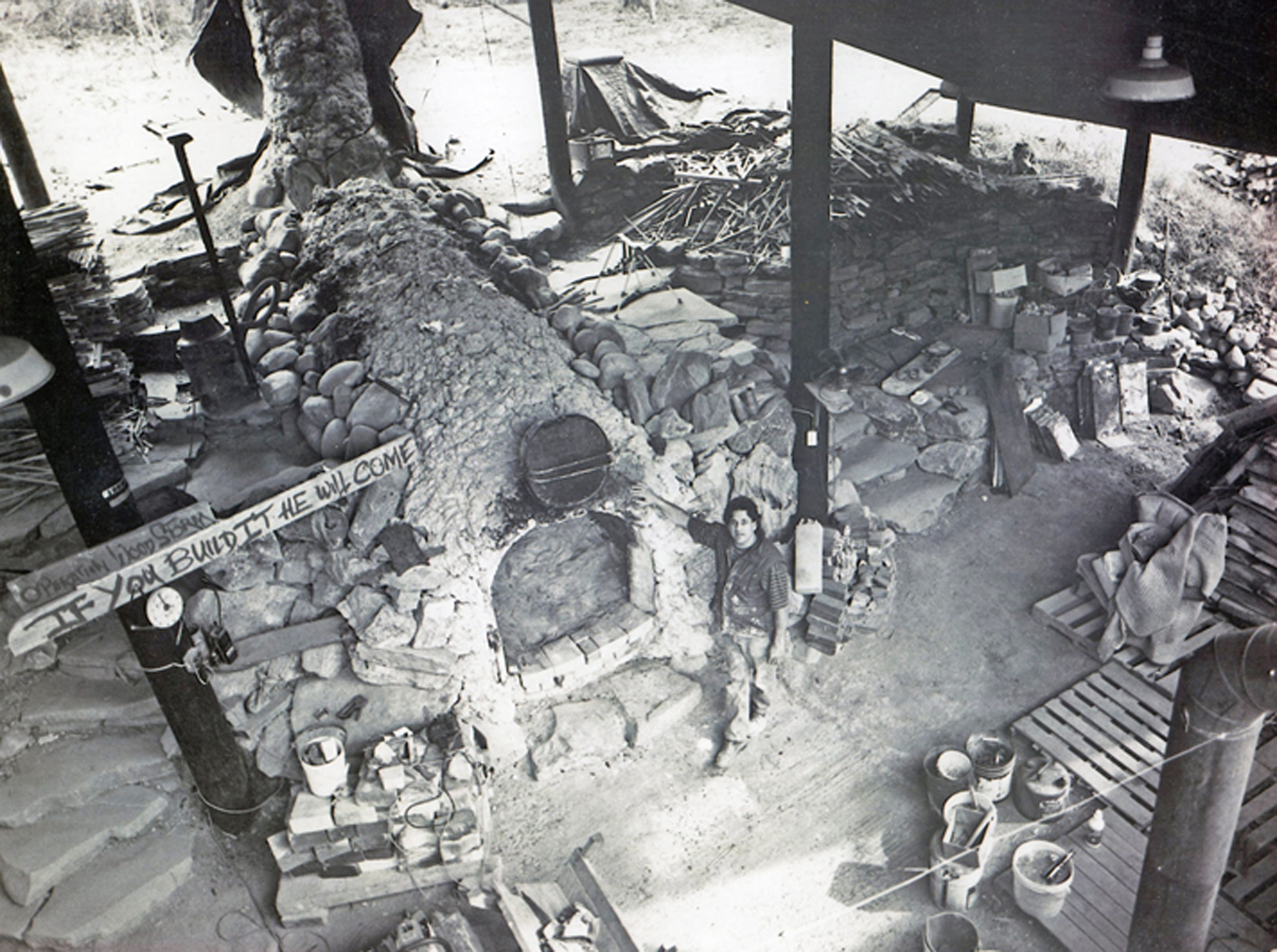
Anagama Kiln in New Jersey, USA, 1979

The anagama kiln (Japanese Kanji: 穴窯/ Hiragana: あながま) is an ancient type of pottery kiln brought to Japan by Korean potters around the 5th century. It is a version of the climbing dragon kiln of south China, whose further development was also copied, for example in breaking up the firing space into a series of chambers in the noborigama kiln.

An anagama (a Japanese term meaning "cave kiln") consists of a firing chamber with a firebox at one end and a flue at the other. Although the term "firebox" is used to describe the space for the fire, there is no physical structure separating the stoking space from the pottery space. The term anagama describes single-chamber kilns built in a sloping tunnel shape. In fact, ancient kilns were sometimes built by digging tunnels into banks of clay.

The anagama is fueled with firewood, in contrast to the electric or gas-fueled kilns commonly used by most modern potters. A continuous supply of fuel is needed for firing, as wood thrown into the hot kiln is consumed very rapidly. Stoking occurs round the clock until a variety of variables are achieved including the way the fired pots look inside the kiln, the temperatures reached and sustained, the amount of ash applied, the wetness of the walls and the pots, etc.

Burning wood not only produces heat of up to 1400°C (2,500 °F), it also produces fly ash and volatile salts. Wood ash settles on the pieces during the firing, and the complex interaction between flame, ash, and the minerals of the clay body forms a natural ash glaze. This glaze may show great variation in color, texture, and thickness, ranging from smooth and glossy to rough and sharp. The placement of pieces within the kiln distinctly affects the pottery's appearance, as pieces closer to the firebox may receive heavy coats of ash, or even be immersed in embers, while others deeper in the kiln may only be softly touched by ash effects. Other factors that depend on positioning include temperature and oxidation/reduction. Besides location in the kiln, (as with other fuel-fired updraft kilns) the way pieces are placed near each other affects the flame path, and, thus, the appearance of pieces within localized zones of the kiln can vary as well. It is said that loading an anagama kiln is the most difficult part of the firing. The potter must imagine the flame path as it rushes through the kiln, and use this sense to 'paint the pieces with fire'.

The length of the firing depends on the volume of the kiln and may take anywhere from 48 hours to 12 or more days. The kiln generally takes the same amount of time to cool down. Records of historic firings in large Asian kilns shared by several village potters describe several weeks of steady stoking per firing.

== Kiln variants ==
One variant on the anagama style is the waritake kiln. A waritake kiln is akin to anagama in structure, but it has partition walls built every several meters through the length of the kiln. Each partition can be side stoked.

A noborigama 登り窯 chambered climbing kiln is also built on a slope, and each succeeding chamber is situated higher than the one before it. The chambers in a noborigama are pierced at intervals with stoking ports. Such climbing kilns have been used in Japan since the 17th century. The largest working Noborigama kiln in Japan is located in Shigaraki, in the southern portion of Shiga Prefecture.

The renboshiki noborigama is a multi-chambered climbing kiln. There are many distinguishing characteristics between the noborigama and anagama style. For example, an anagama is somewhat like a half-tube (long vault) with a fire burned at the lower end. A noborigama is like a set of half-tubes (arches or short vaults, buttressing each other) placed side-by-side with piercings that allow each chamber to feed into the next.

The jagama (snake kiln or dragon kiln) is related to anagama, noborigama, and waritake kilns, and was used extensively in China since at least the 3rd century CE. Jagama are tube shaped similarly to anagama kilns, but can be longer at around 60 m. Although partitioned and side stoked, jagama do not have partition walls, rather, improvised walls are created by densely stacking pottery at intervals.

== Characteristics ==
The main advantage of climbing kilns is that heat from the burning fuel is re-used, the same heat heating more than one part of the kiln. Exhaust heat created during firing of the lower part of the kiln, preheats the chambers above. In addition, the cooling ware and walls below preheat the incoming air. Thus, firing of ware in the upper chambers requires only the additional fuel needed to bring the ware, walls and air to peak temperature. (From a thermodynamic point of view, the higher temperature of combustion and cooler exhaust suggest greater efficiency.) A modern type, called a tube kiln improves the efficiency and output still further by having the ware move through the kiln in a direction opposite to that of the hot gasses.

All of these kilns use two counter-flow exchange mechanisms to maintain the air supply and to change the ware being fired, with minimal loss of heat. Each of these exchanges works on the same principle as countercurrent exchange, the principal difference being that the ware is not a fluid.

An advantage of the chambered and semi-chambered variants appears to be that they are partly downdraft, which makes the firing results less sensitive to the way the ware is loaded.

A disadvantage of smaller climbing kilns is a tendency to rapid cooling, caused by the incoming air.

== See also ==
- Six Ancient Kilns
