= Dragon kiln =

Traditional Chinese form of long sloped kiln

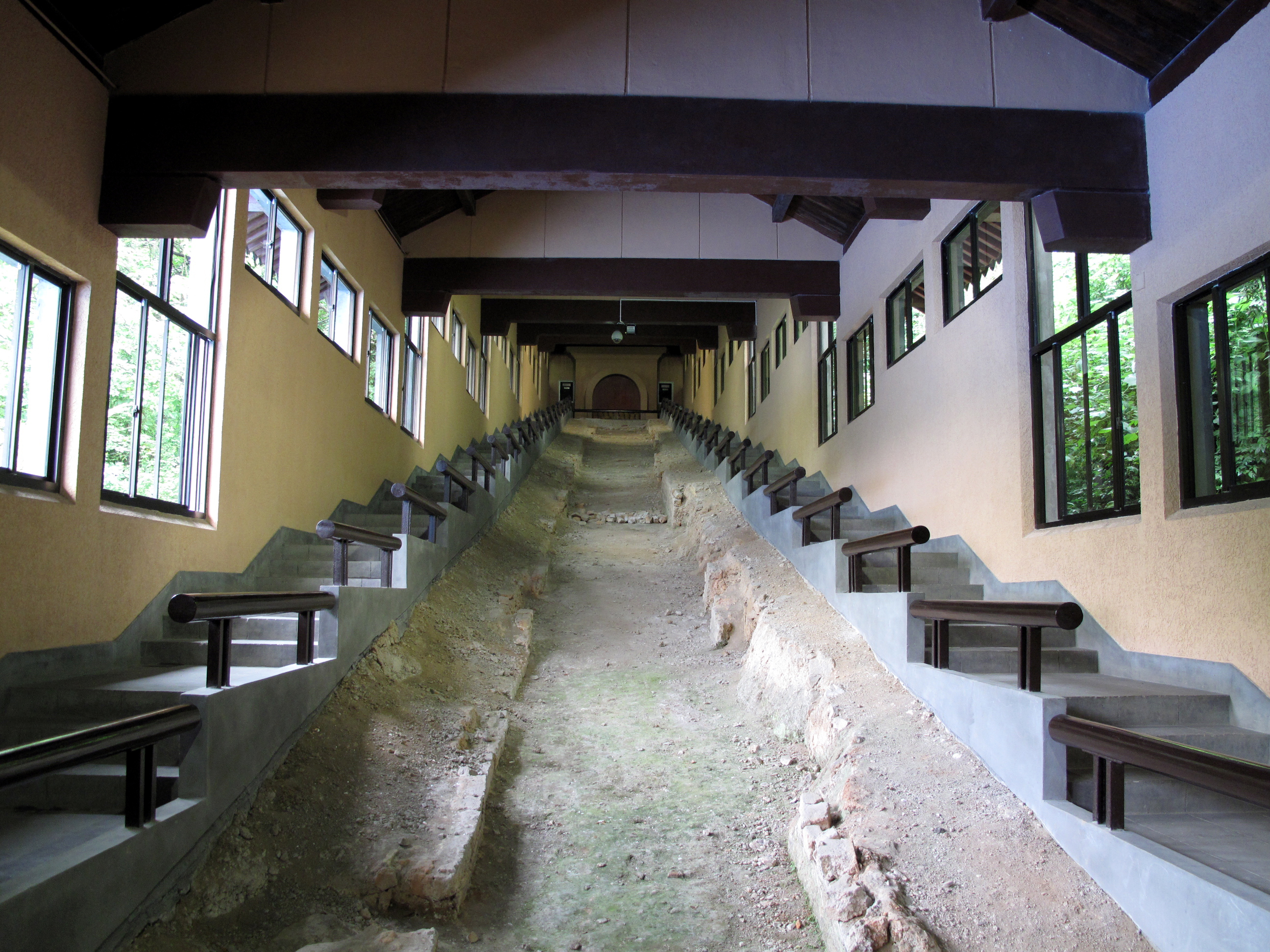
- Excavated floor of a dragon kiln, 40 metres long, of the Southern Song official kiln at Jiaotanxia in Hangzhou

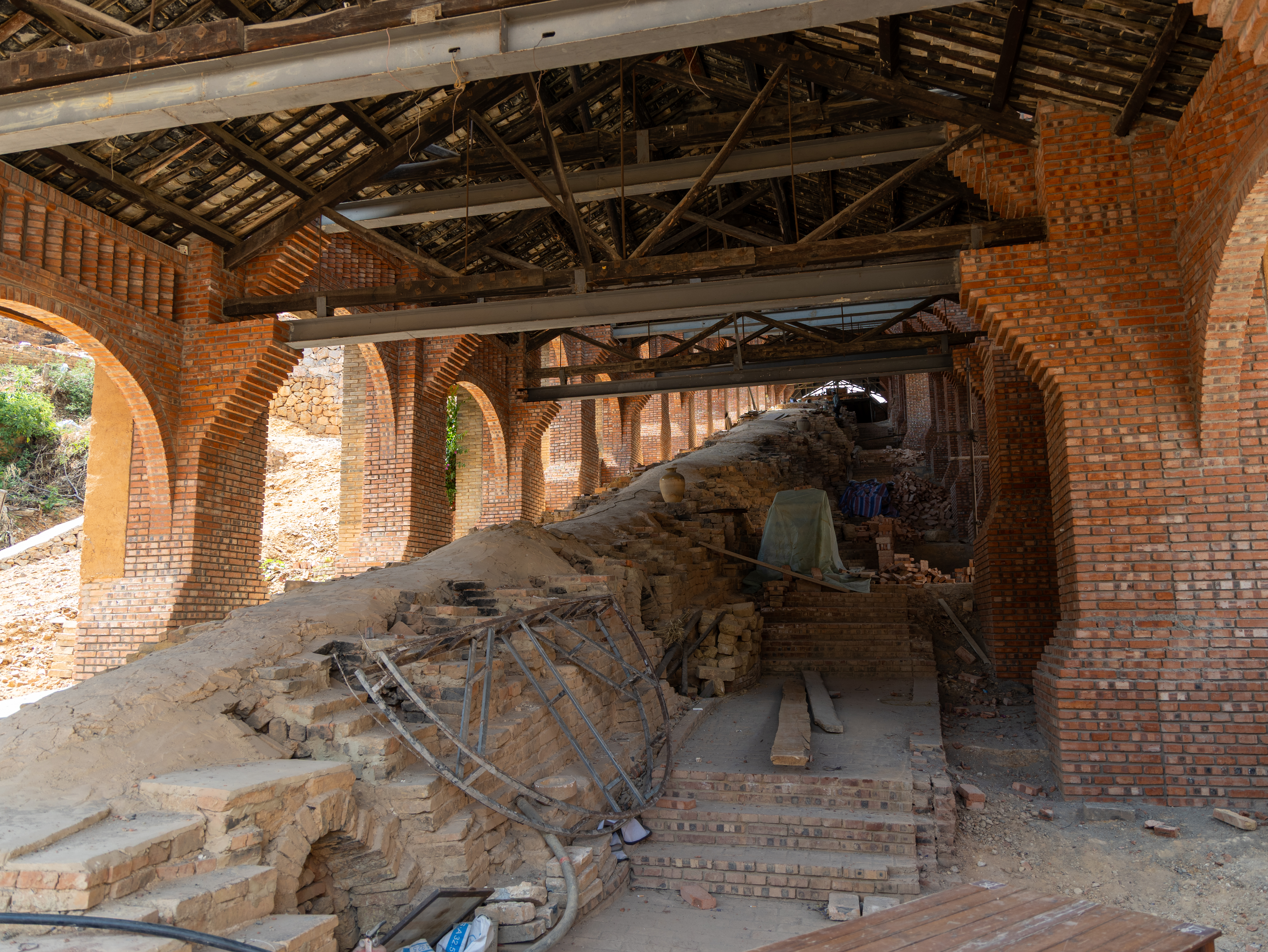
- Dragon kiln at Jianshui, Yunnan

Chinese name
- Traditional Chinese: 龍窯
- Simplified Chinese: 龙窑
Transcriptions
Standard Mandarin
- Hanyu Pinyin: lóng yáo
- Wade–Giles: lung-yao

A dragon kiln (simplified Chinese: 龙窑; traditional Chinese: 龍窯) also known as a climbing kiln, is a traditional Chinese form of kiln, used for Chinese ceramics, especially in southern China. It is long and thin, and relies on having a fairly steep slope, typically between 10° and 16°, up which the kiln runs. The kiln could achieve the very high temperatures, sometimes as high as 1,400 °C (2,550 °F), necessary for high-fired wares including stoneware and porcelain, which long challenged European potters, and some examples were very large, up to 60 metres (200 ft) long, allowing up to 25,000 pieces to be fired at a time. By the early 12th century CE they might be over 135 metres long, allowing still larger quantities to be fired; more than 100,000 have been claimed.

== History ==
According to recent excavations in Shangyu District in the northeast of Zhejiang province and elsewhere, the origins of the dragon kiln may go back as far as the Shang dynasty (c. 1600 to 1046 BCE), and is linked to the introduction of stoneware, fired at 1,200 °C (2,190 °F) or more. These kilns were much smaller than later examples, at some 5–12 metres (16–39 ft) long, and also sloped far less.

The type had certainly developed by the Warring States period, and by the Eastern Wu kingdom (220–280 CE), there were over 60 kilns at Shangyu. Thereafter it remained the main design used in southern China until the Ming dynasty. The pottery areas of south China are mostly hilly, whereas those on the plains of north China typically lack suitable slopes; here the mantou kiln type predominated.

The Nanfeng Kiln in Guangdong province is several centuries old and still functioning. It was a producer of Shiwan ware as well as architectural ceramics, and today also functions as a tourist attraction.

== Characteristics ==
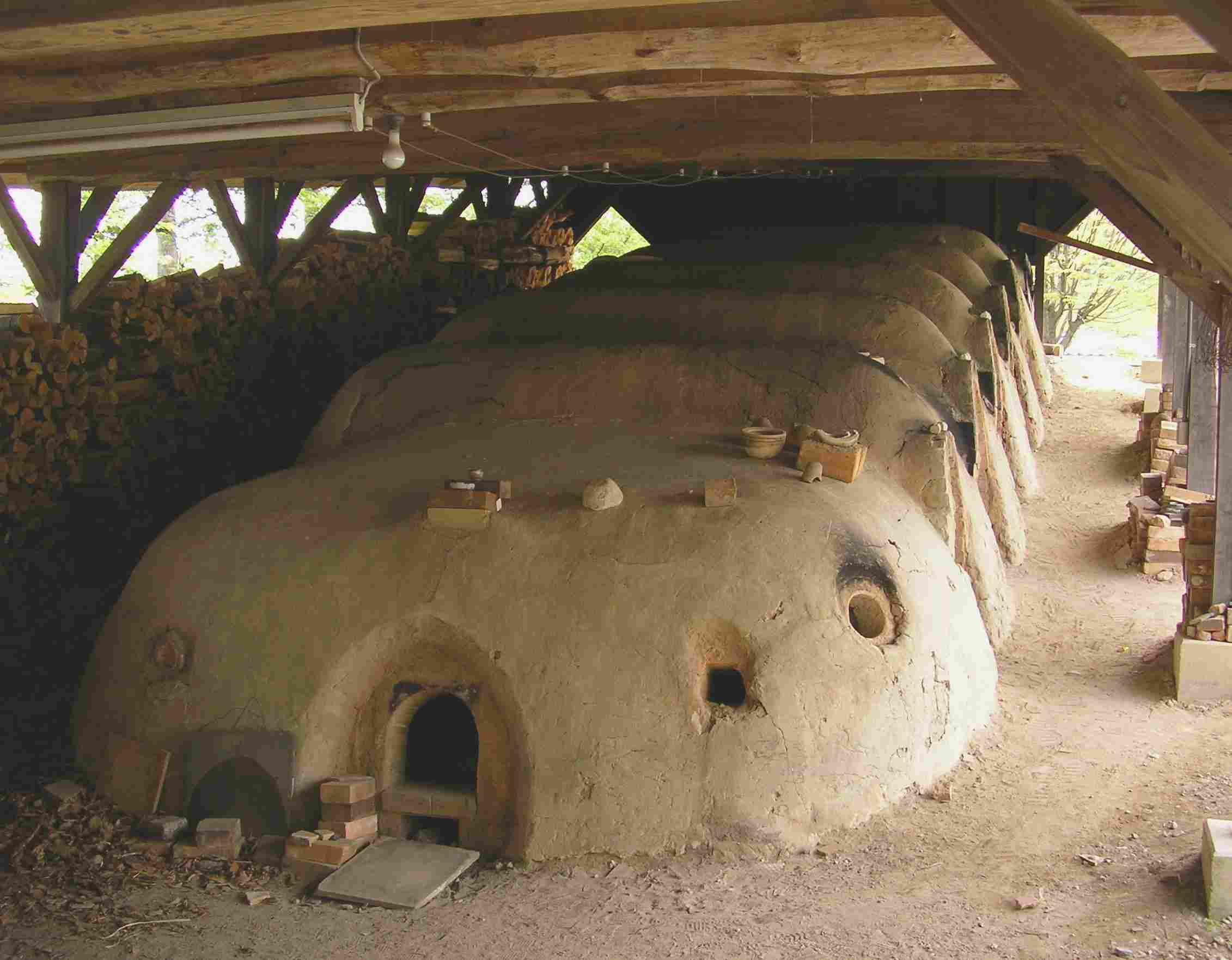
Japanese chambered version

The kilns were normally made of brick, and are one type of "cross-draught" kilns, where the flames travel more or less horizontally, rather than up from or down to the floor. The firing time could be relatively short, meaning about 24 hours for a small kiln. Early kilns were rising tunnels, not divided into chambers, but with a step at intervals giving relatively flat floor levels, and perhaps using gravel or similar material on the floor to allow vertical stacks to be rested. From the Southern Song period (1127–1279), some kilns were built as a series of chambers, stepped as they ran up the slope, and with connecting doors to allow access to both the kiln-workers during loading and unloading, and the heat during firing. There might be up to 12 chambers. Chambered kilns were usual for making Longquan celadon.

The main fire chamber was at the bottom, but there might be additional "stoke holes" to allow adding extra fuel at intervals up the slope, as well as peep holes to allow sight of the interior. At the far, top, end there was a chimney, but given the up-draught of the slope, this did not need to be tall, and might be omitted altogether. The size and shape of the kilns and chambers within varied considerably. Firing was begun at the bottom end and moved up the slope. The fuel might be wood or (generally less often) coal, which affected the atmosphere of the firing; wood giving a reducing atmosphere and coal an oxidizing one. The weight of pottery produced was about the same as the weight of wood required. Generally saggars were used, at least in later periods. These were an innovation of Ding ware from the north in the Song dynasty.

The kilns allowed large quantities of pottery to be fired at high temperatures, but the firing was not usually even across the length of the kiln, which often produced different effects on pieces at different levels. Very often the higher chambers produced the better pieces, as they heated up more slowly. As one example, the wide range of colours seen in Chinese celadon wares such as Yue ware and Longquan celadon is largely explained by variations in firing conditions. If the pieces are heated too high, instead of the desired celadon color, the pieces will turn brown. Variations in the shades of white porcelains between and within the northern Ding ware and the southern Qingbai were also the result of the fuel used. Some of the most advanced chambered kilns were built to fire Dehua porcelain, where precise control of high temperatures was essential. The dragon kiln form was copied in Korea, from sometime between 100 and 300 CE, and much later in Japan in various types of climbing anagama kilns, and elsewhere in East Asia.

The large quantities fired were not unique to Asian pottery; the largest kilns making ancient Roman pottery, of a totally different form, could fire up to 40,000 pieces at a time.
