= Mantou kiln =

Ancient type of Chinese pottery kiln

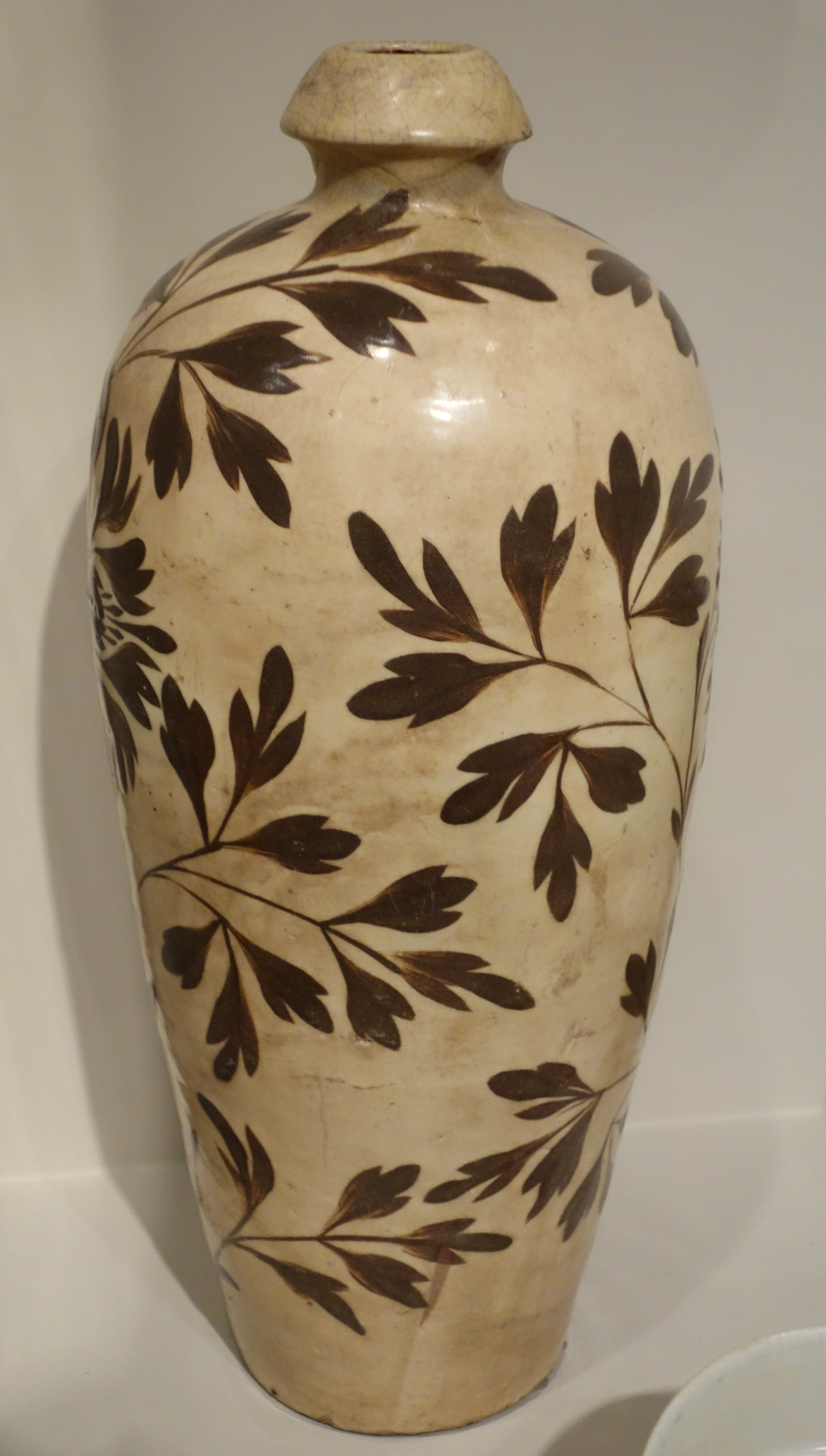
Cizhou ware fired in a mantou kiln: meiping vase with slip-painted peony foliage, Jin dynasty, 12th or 13th century

The mantou kiln (Chinese: 饅頭窯; pinyin: mántóu yáo; Wade–Giles: man-t'ou yao) or horseshoe-shaped kiln was the most common type of pottery kiln in north China, in historical periods when the dragon kiln dominated south China; both seem to have emerged in the Warring States period of approximately 475 to 221 BC. It is named (in both English and Chinese) after the Chinese mantou bun or roll, whose shape it (very approximately) resembles; the ground plan resembles a horseshoe. The kilns are roughly round, with a low dome covering the central firing area, and are generally only 2 to 3 metres (6.6 to 9.8 ft) across inside. However it is capable of reaching very high temperatures, up to about 1,370 °C (2,500 °F). There is a door or bricked-up opening at the front for loading and unloading, and one or two short chimneys at the rear.

They are one type of "cross-draught" kilns, where the flames travel more or less horizontally, rather than up from or down to the floor. The kilns were normally made of brick; sometimes most of the structure was dug out below the loess soil, with only the dome and chimney protruding above ground. In either case the interior was normally lined with a refractory fireclay. In some cases, especially in later periods, the fire box was approached by a tunnel. Initially the kilns were fired with wood, but during the Northern Song period (960–1127) there was a general switch to coal, easily found in north China, which required a smaller fire box, but the introduction of saggars to protect the pieces from gritty coal ash. This changed the reducing quality of the atmosphere during firing, which affected the colours of various wares, wood giving a reducing atmosphere and coal an oxidizing one. A firing might take as long as two weeks, including the cooling time.

The details of the design could be very variable. A temporary "bag wall" might be built at the front of the kiln, once loaded, to protect the wares from the direct flames, and enclose the fire. The back interior wall might be straight, giving a semi-circular shape to the chamber. Various different arrangements for controlling the airflow at front and back by vents and stone doors are found. Generally the firing was even across the various parts of the chamber compared to the dragon kiln, but the load far smaller, with saggars perhaps only hundreds of pieces, rather than the tens of thousands a large dragon kiln could take for a single firing.

Wares fired in mantou kilns include Ding ware, Yaozhou ware and other Northern Celadons, Jun, Ru, and Cizhou wares. The zhenyao "egg-shaped kiln", developed for Jingdezhen ware in the late Ming dynasty, is in some ways a compromise between mantou and dragon kilns, like a stretched mantou kiln. Official Guan ware had been made at Jingdezhen in a northern-style mantou kiln, rare this far south.
