= Mantou =

Steamed bread bun popular in Northern China

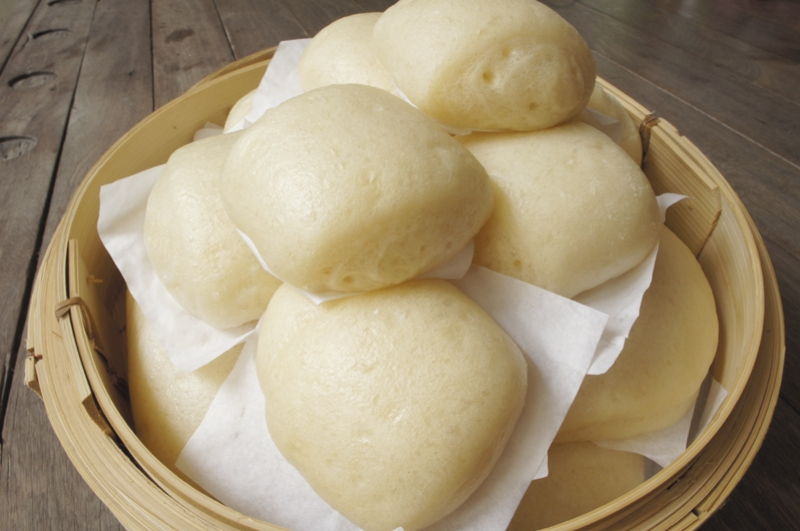
- Classic white mantou
- Alternative names: Chinese steamed bun, Chinese steamed bread
- Type: Bread, dim sum
- Place of origin: China
- Region or state: East Asia
- Main ingredients: Wheat flour, water, leavening agents

Chinese name
- Traditional Chinese: 饅頭
- Simplified Chinese: 馒头
Transcriptions
Standard Mandarin
- Hanyu Pinyin: mántou
- Gwoyeu Romatzyh: man.tour
- Tongyong Pinyin: mánto̊u
- IPA: [mǎn.tʰoʊ]
Yue: Cantonese
- Jyutping: maan^{4} tau^{4}
Southern Min
- Hokkien POJ: bán-thô or bán-thâu

Alternative Chinese name
- Traditional Chinese: 麵頭
- Simplified Chinese: 面头
Transcriptions
Standard Mandarin
- Hanyu Pinyin: miàntóu
Southern Min
- Hokkien POJ: mī-thâu

Mantou (traditional Chinese: 饅頭; simplified Chinese: 馒头), often referred to as a Chinese steamed bun, is a white and soft type of steamed bread or bun popular in northern China. Folk etymology connects the name mantou to a tale about Zhuge Liang.

== Description ==
Mantou are typically eaten as a staple food in northern parts of China where wheat, rather than rice, is grown. They are made with milled wheat flour, water and leavening agents. In size and texture, they range from 4 centimeters (1.6 in), soft and fluffy in the most elegant restaurants, to over 15 centimeters (5.9 in), firm and dense for a worker’s lunch. As white flour, being more heavily processed, was once more expensive, white mantou were something of a luxury in preindustrial China.

Traditionally, mantou, bing, and wheat noodles were the staple carbohydrates of the northern Chinese diet, analogous to rice, which forms the mainstay of the southern Chinese diet. They are also known in the south but are often served as street food or in restaurants, rather than as a staple or home cooking. Restaurant mantou are often smaller and more delicate and can be further manipulated, for example, by deep frying and dipping in sweetened condensed milk. Colors or flavors may be added with other ingredients from brown sugar to food coloring in mantou making. For special occasions, mantou are sometimes kneaded into various shapes in Shanxi, Shaanxi, and Shandong.

Precooked mantou are commonly sold in the frozen section of Asian supermarkets, ready for preparation by steaming or heating in the microwave oven.

A similar food, but with a savory or sweet filling inside, is baozi. Mantou is the older word, and in some regions—such as the Jiangnan region of China, and Korea—mantou (or the equivalent local pronunciation of the word) can describe both the filled and unfilled buns. In Japan, the equivalent local reading of the Chinese word (manjū) refers only to filled buns.

== Etymology and history ==
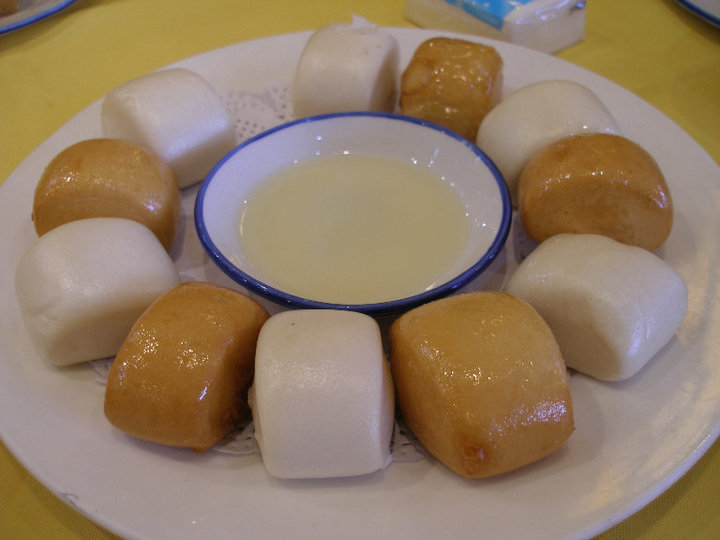
Deep-fried mantou, or "gold and silver mantou", is a popular Chinese dessert served with sweetened condensed milk.

Mantou may have originated in the Qin State of the Zhou dynasty during the reign of King Zhaoxiang (307 BCE – 250 BCE). Mantou, as well as other wheat derived foodstuffs such as noodles, Shaobing and Baozi became popular during the Han dynasty (206 BCE – 206 CE) and collectively were known as 餅; bǐng; mantou was distinguished as 蒸餅; zhēngbǐng or 籠餅; lóngbǐng. During the Western Jin dynasty (265–316 CE), Shu Xi (束皙) wrote about steamed cakes (蒸餅; zhēngbǐng) in his "Ode to boiled cakes" (湯餅賦; tāngbǐngfù), written around 300 CE. He first called them mantou (曼頭; màntóu). In this book, it was advised to eat this in a banquet during the approach of spring.

The Mongols are thought to have taken the filled (baozi) style of mantou to many countries of Central and East Asia about the beginning of the Yuan dynasty in the 13th century. The name mantou is cognate to manty and mantı; these are filled dumplings in Turkish, and Uzbek (mantu) cuisines.

== Folklore ==
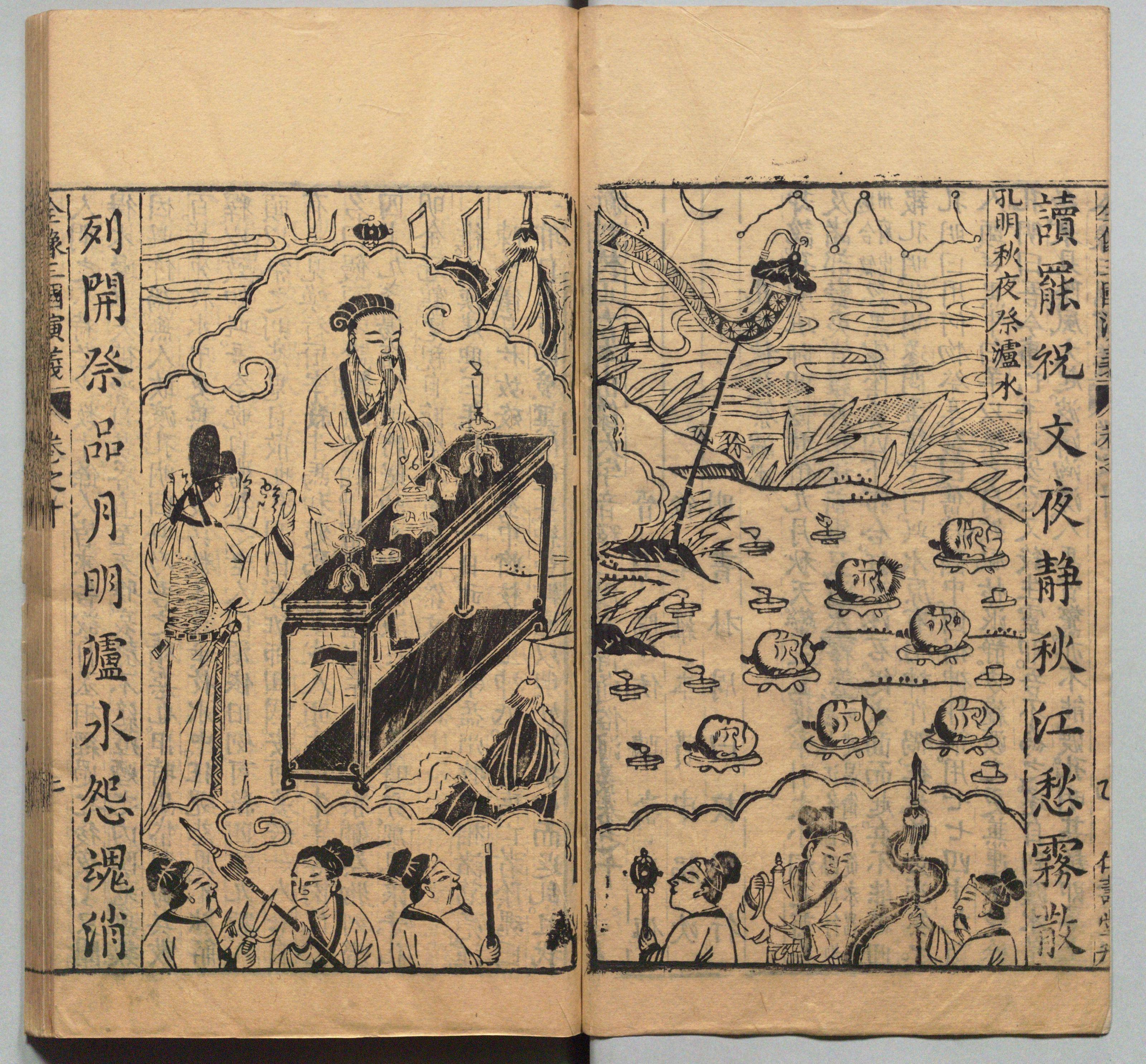
Ming dynasty book illustration of Zhuge Liang offering mantou shaped into resembling human heads to the river

A popular Chinese legend relates that the name mantou actually originated from the homophonous word 蠻頭 mántóu, which literally means "barbarian's head".

The legend was set in the Three Kingdoms period (220–280 CE) when Zhuge Liang, the chancellor of the state of Shu Han, led the Shu army on a campaign against Nanman forces in the southern lands of Shu, which correspond to roughly present-day Yunnan, China, and northern Myanmar.

After subduing the Nanman king Meng Huo, Zhuge Liang led the army back to Shu, but met a swift-flowing river which defied all attempts to cross it. A barbarian lord informed him that the river was raging due to the spirits of the enemies (bamboo army) he killed using fire previously. In olden days, the barbarians would sacrifice 50 men and throw their heads into the river to appease the river deity and allow them to cross. As Zhuge Liang did not want to cause any more of his men to lose their lives, he ordered his men to slaughter the livestock the army brought along, and fill their meat into buns shaped roughly like human heads (round with a flat base). The buns were then thrown into the river. After a successful crossing, he named the bun "barbarian's head" (mántóu, 蠻頭, which evolved into the modern 饅頭). Another version of the story relates back to Zhuge Liang's southern campaign when he instructed that his soldiers who had fallen sick from diarrhea and other illnesses in the swampy region be fed with steamed buns with meat or sweet fillings.

== Variations of mantou ==
Northern Chinese mantou

- Ingredients: Typically made with wheat flour, water, and yeast. They may include a bit of sugar for sweetness.
- Texture: Northern mantou is generally denser and chewier. The dough is often kneaded thoroughly to develop gluten, resulting in a firmer texture.
- Shape and size: Usually larger and rounder. They can be plain or filled with various ingredients.
- Serving: Often served as a staple side dish with meals, especially in northern regions like Beijing and Shanxi.

Southern Chinese mantou

- Ingredients: Also made with wheat flour, but may use different types of flour or add rice flour for a slightly different texture. Sugar is often more prominent in the dough.
- Texture: Southern mantou tends to be softer and fluffier, with a lighter and more delicate texture due to variations in the kneading process and fermentation.
- Shape and size: Often smaller and can be shaped into different forms. They may also be filled, but plain versions are common as well.
- Serving: Commonly served as a snack or breakfast item, and can be found in various forms, including sweet versions with fillings like red bean paste.

Northern Chinese mantou is denser and more substantial, while the southern variety is lighter and fluffier, reflecting regional culinary preferences and local ingredients.

== Variations in meaning outside Northern China ==
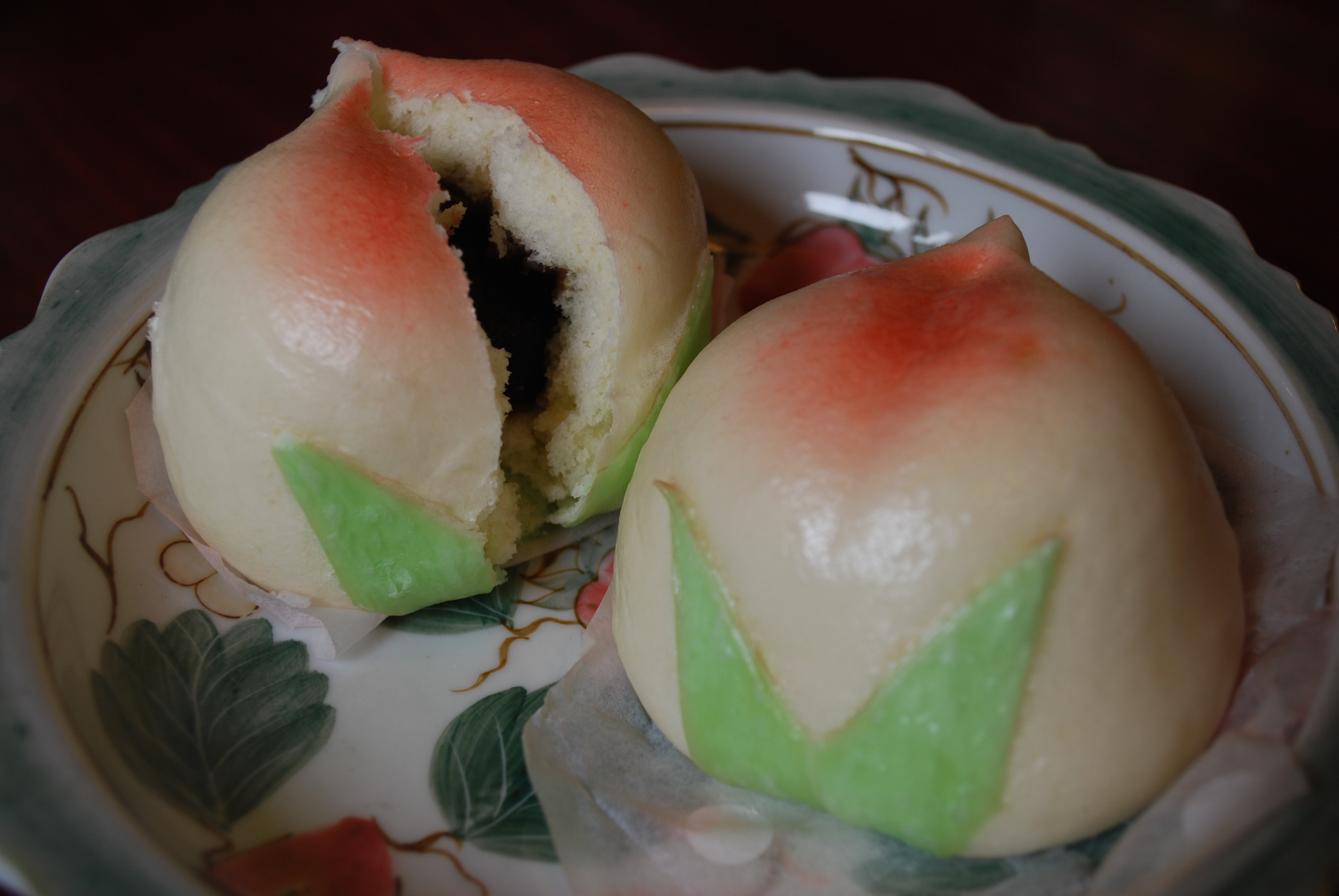
These peach mantous found at a Chinese restaurant in Japan contain red bean paste as fillings.

Prior to the Song dynasty (960–1279), the word mantou meant both filled and unfilled buns. The term baozi arose in the Song dynasty to indicate filled buns only. As a result, mantou gradually came to indicate only unfilled buns in Mandarin and some varieties of Chinese.

In many areas, however, mantou still retains its meaning of filled buns. In the Jiangnan region where Wu Chinese is spoken, it usually means both filled and unfilled buns. In Shanxi, where Jin Chinese is spoken, unfilled buns are often called momo (饃饃), simply the characters for "steamed bun". The name momo spread to Tibet and Nepal and usually now refers to filled buns or dumplings.

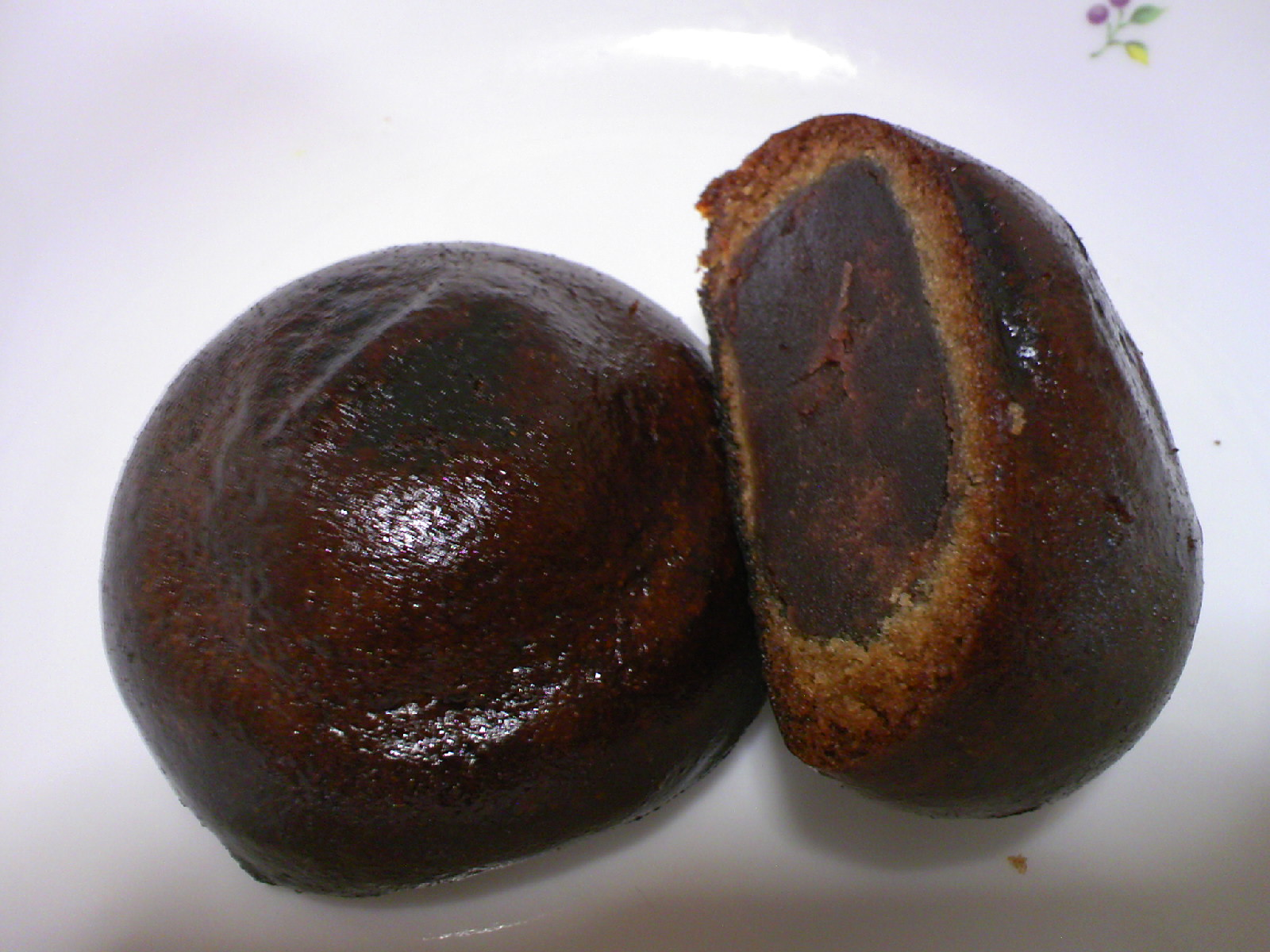
Manjū

The name mantou is cognate to manty and Manti; these are filled dumplings in Armenian, Persian, Uzbek, and Pakistani (mantu, originated from Turko-Mongol immigrants) cuisines. In Japan, manjū (饅頭) usually indicates filled buns, which traditionally contain bean paste or minced meat-vegetable mixture (nikuman 肉まん "meat manjū"). Filled mantou are called siyopaw in Philippine, ultimately derived from Chinese shāobāo (燒包). In Thailand they serve salapao (ซาลาเปา), a filled mantou. In Korea, mandu (Korean: 만두; Hanja: 饅頭) can refer to both baozi (飽子) or jiaozi (餃子). In Mongolian cuisine, the buuz and mantuu are steamed dumplings, a steamed variation is said to have led to the Korean mandu. In Singapore and Malaysia, chili crab is commonly served with a fried version of mantou. In Nauru and Papua New Guinea, mantou are known as mãju.

== See also ==
- Da bao, an extra-large version of mantou
- Mantou kiln, a type of pottery kiln named after the bun
- Mandarin roll
- Mantı
- Baozi
- Manjū
- Mandu
- Wotou
- Dampfnudel
- List of buns
- List of Chinese dishes
- List of steamed foods
