= Da bao =

Chinese steamed bun

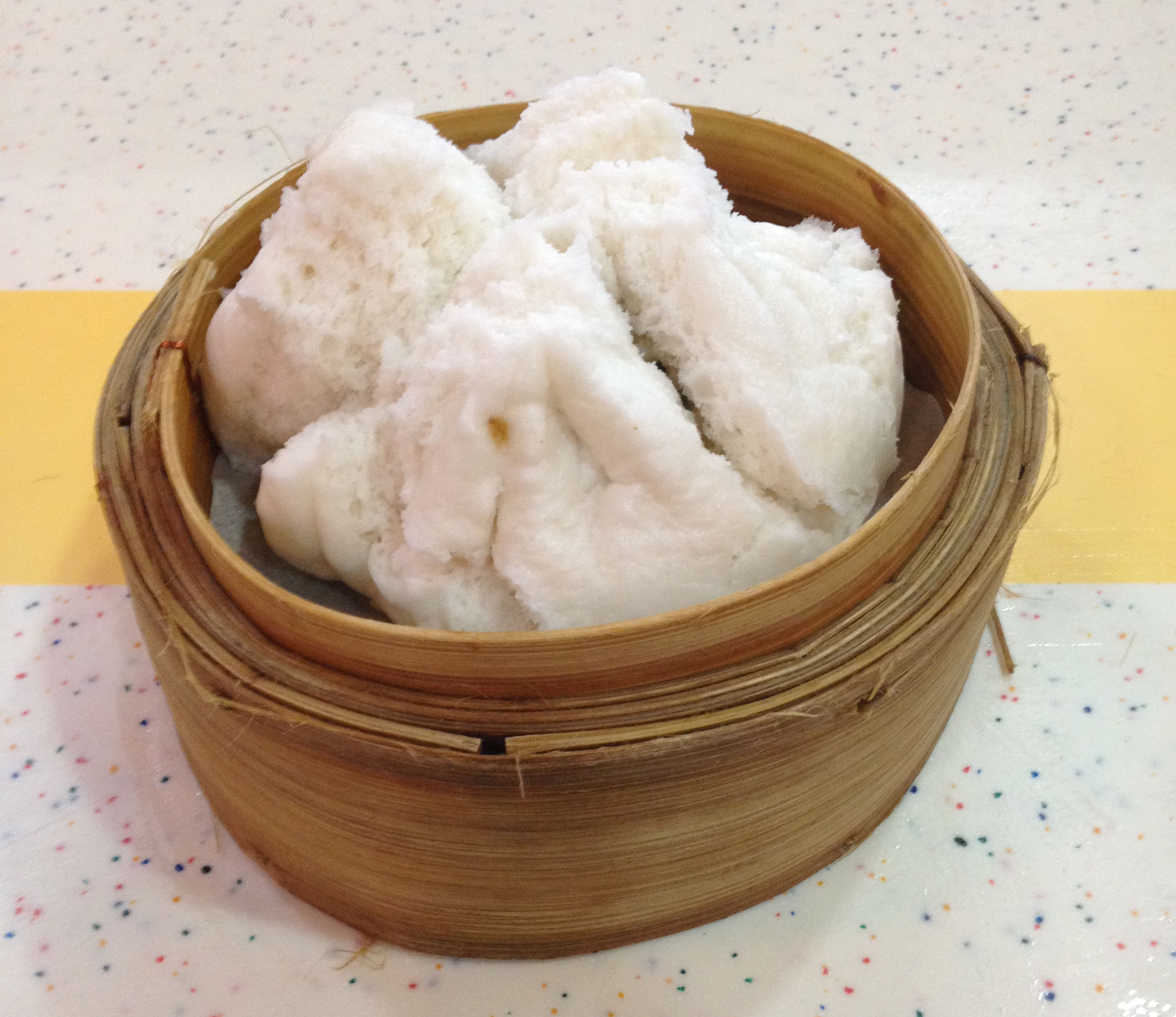
Da bao

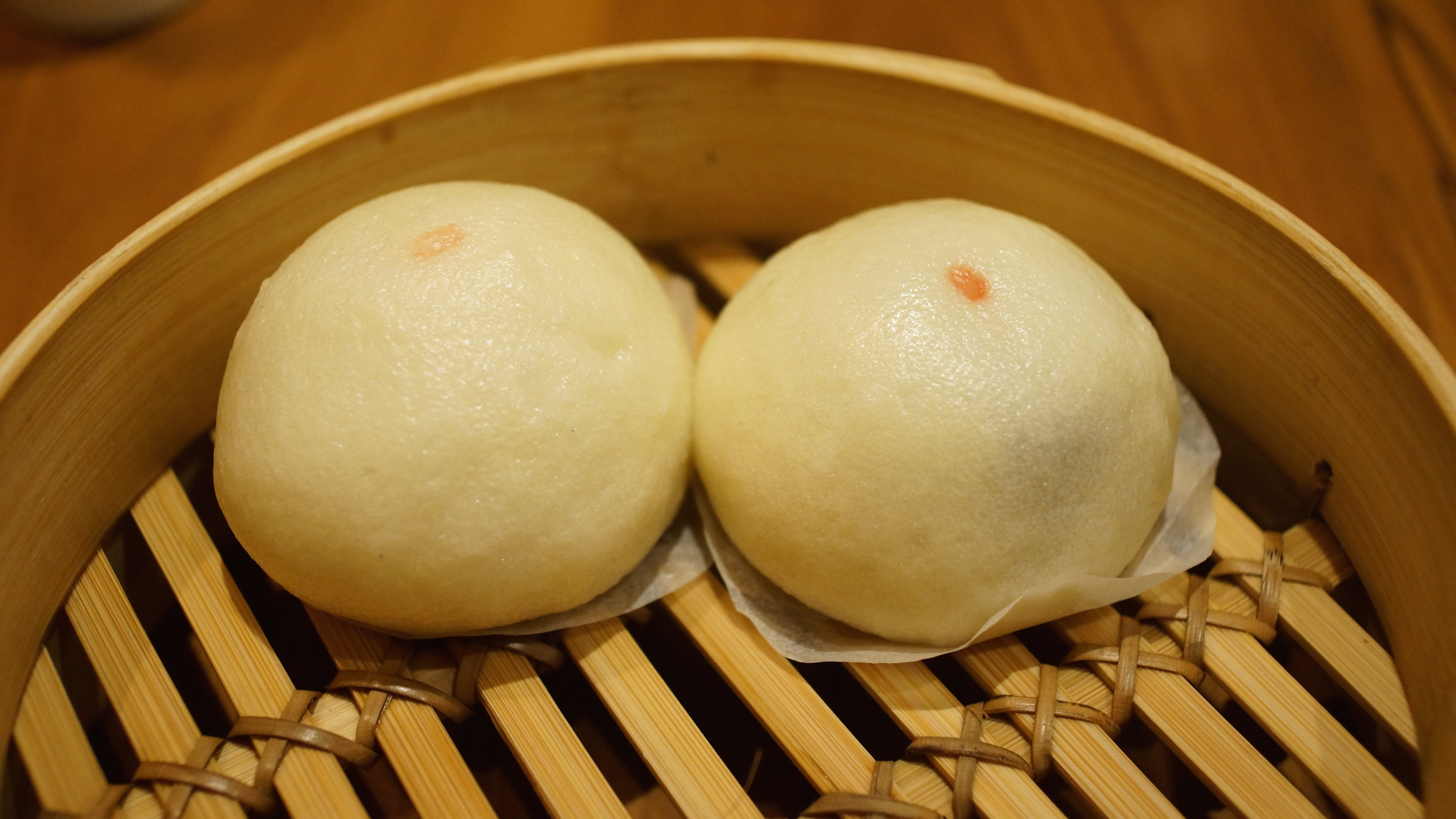
Da bao at the Din Tai Fung restaurant in Taipei

Da bao (Chinese: 大包) or dai bao is an extra-large version of the Chinese steamed bun. When translated, the name literally means 'big bun'. It originated in Guangzhou and is commonly sold in Canton, Hong Kong, Malaysia and Singapore. Compared to the smaller xiaolongbao, the da bao uses fully fermented dough, giving it a less dense texture.

The common fillings found in da bao usually consist of either pork or chicken minced meat and a hard-boiled egg. Other common fillings include mushrooms or Chinese sausage. Sweet and vegetarian versions also exist.

== See also ==
- List of buns
- List of steamed foods
